= List of public art in Brighton and Hove =

This is a selective list of public art in Brighton and Hove, a city on the south coast of England formed by the amalgamation of two towns and their surrounding areas. For the purposes of this list, public art is defined as a permanent, three-dimensional, open-air work. Works on or inside buildings, along with cemetery monuments, are generally excluded.

== Brighton ==
Image	Work	Location	Date	Sculptor/Artist	Source	Coordinates
	The Dolphin Fountain	Brighton Square, The Lanes	1 March 1992	James Osbourne		50°49′19″N 0°08′25″W
	Statue of George IV	Church Street, opposite Royal Pavilion	9 October 1828	Francis Leggatt Chantrey		50°49′24″N 0°08′13″W
	Isis	Royal Sussex County Hospital	24 July 2000	William Lasd/un		
	Life Begins	Royal Sussex County Hospital	2007	George Cutts		
	Boy and Girl	Royal Sussex County Hospital	2007	Jon Mills		
	Buoys	Royal Sussex County Hospital	2009	Ally Wallace		
	Kiss Wall	Seafront, near East Street	22 September 1992	Bruce Williams		
	The Fossil Tree (National Cycle Network route marker)	Kings Road, near entrance to Brighton Pier	2000	Jon Mills		50°49′10″N 0°08′12″W
	Afloat	Seafront, near East Street	1998	Hamish Black		50°49′07″N 0°08′21″W
	Passacaglia	Beach opposite Kings Road arches	1998	Charles Hadcock		50°49′12″N 0°08′38″W
	Peace Statue	Brighton–Hove boundary, Kingsway	12 October 1912	Newbury Abbot Trent		50°49′21″N 0°09′25″W
	Patcham Pylons	A23 London Road	1928	John Leopold Denman		50°52′50″N 0°09′55″W
	Statue of Steve Ovett	Madeira Drive	24 July 2012	Peter Webster		50°49′07″N 0°07′48″W
	Statue of Queen Victoria	Victoria Gardens	8 December 1897	Carlo Nicoli		50°49′26″N 0°08′12″W
	Statue of Max Miller	New Road/Pavilion Gardens	1 May 2005	Peter Webster		50°49′24″N 0°08′21″W
	The Kissing Bridge	Circus Parade, New England Road	9 September 1998	Nigel Boonham		
	Tay (AIDS memorial)	New Steine	9 October 2009	Romany Mark Bruce		50°49′13″N 0°07′54″W
	Spring and Summer	Preston Park	1874 (moved 1928)	unknown		50°50′14″N 0°08′36″W
	Jubilee Clock Tower	Queen's Road	26 June 1888	John Johnson		50°49′25″N 0°08′37″W
	Frankland Monument	Stanmer Park	June 1775	unknown		50°52′00″N 0°06′09″W
	Statue of Sir John Cordy Burrows	Old Steine Gardens	14 February 1878	Edward Bowring Stephens		50°49′14″N 0°08′16″W
	Victoria Fountain	Old Steine Gardens	24 May 1846	Amon Henry Wilds, William Pepper		50°49′15″N 0°08′14″W
	Twins	Churchill Square	3 September 1998	Charlie Hooker		50°49′25″N 0°08′44″W

== Hove ==
Image	Work	Location	Date	Sculptor/Artist	Source	Coordinates
	Statue of Captain William Henry Cecil George Pechell	Waterloo Street	February 1859	Matthew Noble		
	Sediment and Cut	Connaught Road	August 2004	Ekkehard Altenburger		
	Fingermaze	Hove Park	2006	Chris Drury		50°50′40″N 0°10′19″W
	Statue of Queen Victoria	Grand Avenue	9 February 1901	Thomas Brock		50°49′29″N 0°10′09″W
	The Juggler	Hove Town Hall	December 1995	Helen Collis		50°49′40″N 0°10′12″W

== War memorials ==
Image	Work	Location	Date	Sculptor/Artist	Source	Coordinates
	The Bugler	Regency Square	29 October 1904	Charles Leonard Hartwell, John William Simpson		50°49′12″N 0°08′38″W
	Indian Memorial Gate	Royal Pavilion	26 October 1921	Thomas Tyrwhitt		50°49′20″N 0°08′18″W
	Brighton War Memorial	Old Steine	7 October 1922	John William Simpson		50°49′17″N 0°08′13″W
	Egyptian Campaign Memorial	Old Steine	1888			50°49′18″N 0°08′13″W
	Hove War Memorial	Grand Avenue	27 February 1921	Edwin Lutyens		50°49′37″N 0°10′07″W
	The Chattri	South Downs, Patcham	1922	Swinton Jacob		50°53′03″N 0°08′49″W
