= Statue of George IV, Brighton =

Statue in Brighton, England

Statue of George IV
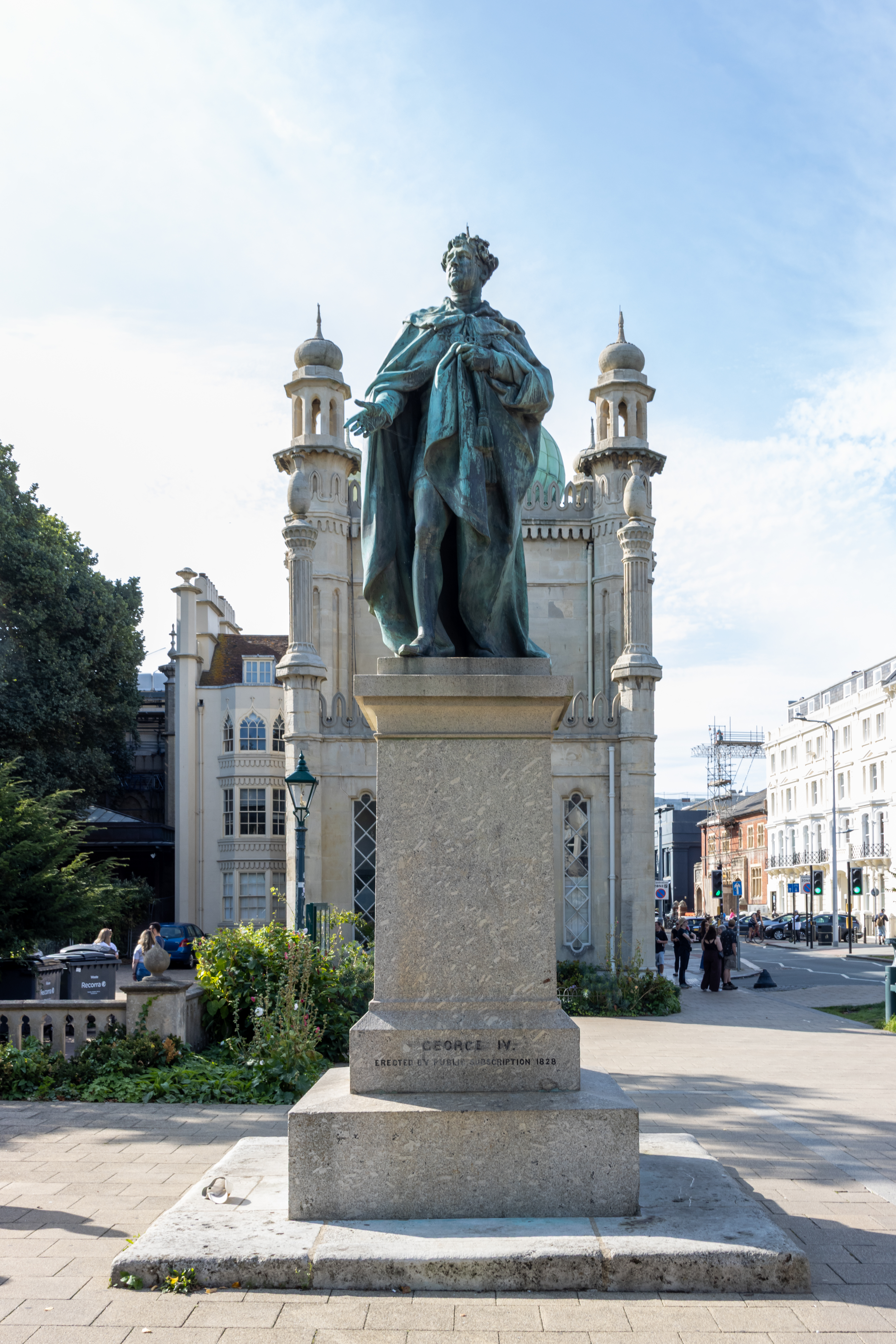
- The statue in 2025
- Artist: Francis Leggatt Chantrey
- Completion date: 9 October 1828
- Medium: bronze
- Subject: George IV
- Location: Brighton, England; 50°49′24″N 0°08′13″W

The Statue of George IV stands outside the Royal Pavilion complex in Brighton, on the south coast of England. It was commissioned in 1822 as a tribute to King George IV and unveiled in 1828. It was sculpted by Sir Francis Leggatt Chantrey and is now a Grade II listed building.

== Background ==
George IV (1762–1830) was a frequent visitor to Brighton, beginning in 1785 when still a prince (he acted as prince regent from 1811, owing to his father's illness, and inherited the throne in 1820). He commissioned prominent architects to create the Royal Pavilion, which took 35 years to complete. The Pavilion was highly influential on Regency architecture and especially the architecture of Brighton. George continued to frequent the town and entertain at the Pavilion throughout the Regency period and after ascending to the throne, helping to establish Brighton as a fashionable seaside resort.

== Commissioning ==
The first statue of George in Brighton was sculpted in stone by John Charles Felix Rossi and erected in 1802 but the prince considered it unflattering. It suffered badly from weathering and was removed in 1819. In March 1822, George Wyndham, 3rd Earl of Egremont, the Lord Lieutenant of Sussex, opened a public subscription fund for a replacement statue. Wyndham was an admirer of Chantrey's work and commissioned him to create the statue. The work was Chantrey's first sculpture in bronze. The fund remained open for eight years. Clifford Musgrave, in his history of the pavilion, claimed that the subscriptions were insufficient to cover the whole cost of the statue and that Chantrey made up the shortfall, but this is contradicted by Chantrey's accounts and Wyndham's archived correspondence.

The statue was cast from 4 tonnes (4.4 tons) of metal from the Ordnance Office. Chantrey's fee was 3,000 guineas. He worked from his own foundry in Pimlico, London, which the art historian Margaret Whinney considered to be indicative of a new era of entrepreneurial sculptors who had wealth and social standing. Chantrey made a replica of the statue in 1831, which stands on George Street in Edinburgh, and a copy in marble which was installed inside Windsor Castle in 1829.

== Description ==
The statue stands just outside the Royal Pavilion complex, close to the north gate. George is standing, wearing robes and the cape of the Order of the Garter. His head is turned slightly to the right. His left hand is grasping his robes and his right arm is outstretched. The sculpture is in bronze and over-life-size at 2.7 metres (9 feet) tall.

It stands on a rectangular granite pedestal 3.15 metres (10.3 feet) high and just over 2 metres (6 feet 7 inches) wide at its widest point. On the back of the statue, at the bottom of the robe, is a small signature, "George IV/MDCCCXXVIII/Chantrey, S. C.".

== History ==
The statue was unveiled on 9 October 1828. The occasion was marked with a public dinner, attended by over 120 guests, at the Old Ship Hotel. It originally stood on the Old Steine, to the east of the Royal Pavilion, but moved to its current location by the north gate in 1922 to make room for Brighton War Memorial. It now stands opposite the statue of Queen Victoria (by Carlo Nicoli, unveiled 1897), George's niece and eventual successor. The proposal for the move generated considerable local debate.

The statue has been a Grade II listed building since October 1952. Listed status provides legal protection from unauthorised demolition or modification.

== See also ==
- Grade II listed buildings in Brighton and Hove: S
- List of public art in Brighton and Hove
