= Grade II listed buildings in Brighton and Hove: S =

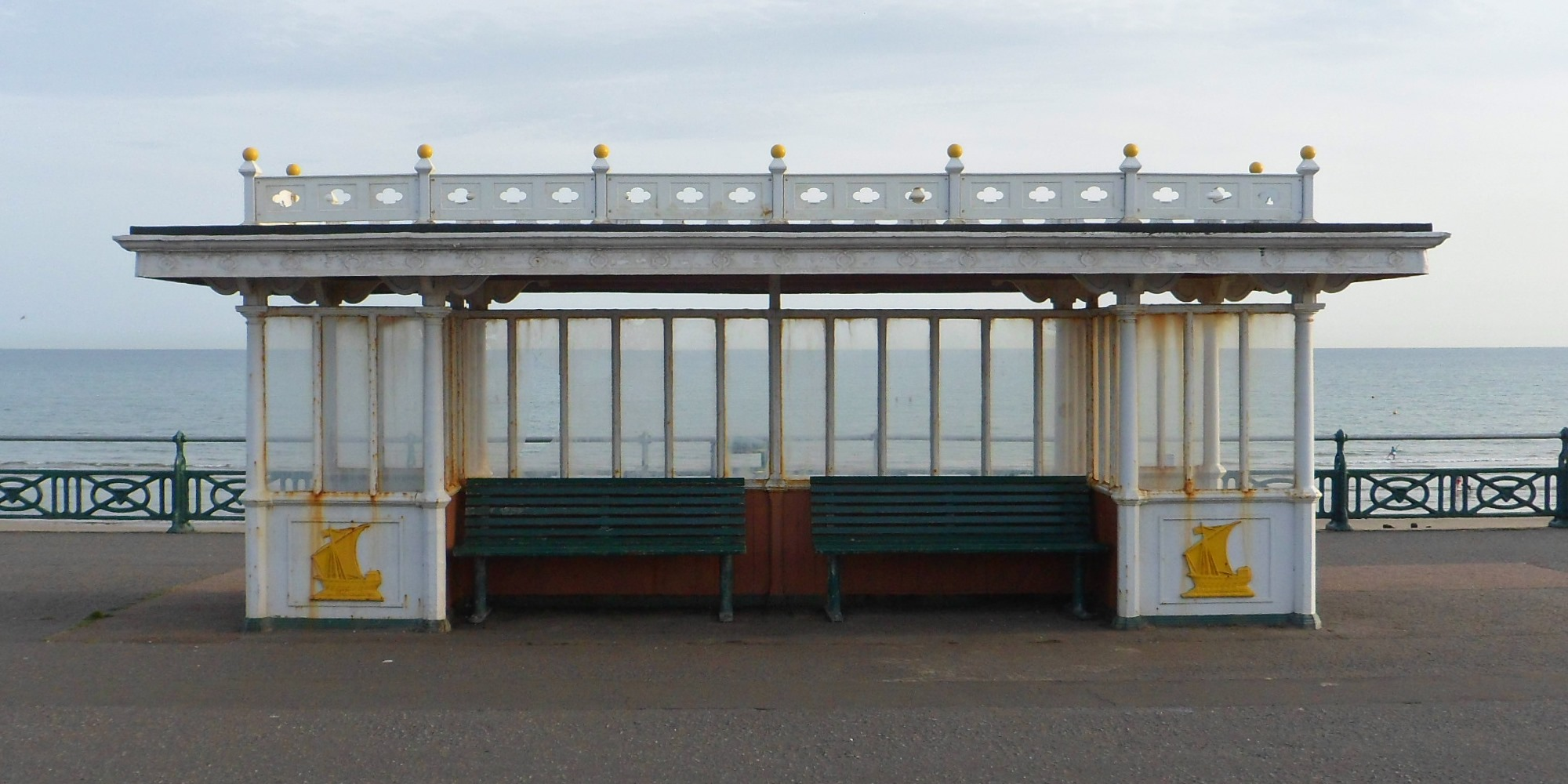
Hove Corporation erected several cast iron shelters on the seafront in Hove in the mid-19th century. This example is close to Hove Lagoon.

As of February 2001, there were 1,124 listed buildings with Grade II status in the English city of Brighton and Hove. The total at 2009 was similar. The city, on the English Channel coast approximately 52 miles (84 km) south of London, was formed as a unitary authority in 1997 by the merger of the neighbouring towns of Brighton and Hove. Queen Elizabeth II granted city status in 2000.

In England, a building or structure is defined as "listed" when it is placed on a statutory register of buildings of "special architectural or historic interest" by the Secretary of State for Culture, Media and Sport, a Government department, in accordance with the Planning (Listed Buildings and Conservation Areas) Act 1990. English Heritage, a non-departmental public body, acts as an agency of this department to administer the process and advise the department on relevant issues. There are three grades of listing status. The Grade II designation is the lowest, and is used for "nationally important buildings of special interest". Grade II* is used for "particularly important buildings of more than special interest"; there are 69 such buildings in the city. There are also 24 Grade I listed buildings (defined as being of "exceptional interest" and greater than national importance, and the highest of the three grades) in Brighton and Hove.

This list summarises 134 Grade II-listed buildings and structures whose names begin with S. Numbered buildings with no individual name are listed by the name of the street they stand on. Some listings include contributory fixtures such as surrounding walls or railings in front of the building. These are summarised by notes alongside the building name.

== Listed buildings ==
Contributory fixtures
Note	Listing includes
^{[A]}	Attached railings
^{[B]}	Attached railings and piers
^{[C]}	Attached railings and wall bracket
^{[D]}	Attached walls
^{[E]}	Attached walls and railings
^{[F]}	Attached walls, piers and gate
^{[G]}	Attached walls, piers and railings

Building name	Area	Image	Notes	Refs
St Anne's Convent (former) (More images)	Hove; 50.8277°N 0.1556°W		The building has early 19th-century origins as a villa called Wick Lodge. It was extended before 1909, when it was in use as "a school for ladies"; then in 1947 it was acquired by the Poor Servants of the Mother of God. When listed in 1971 it was a day centre; later, a Buddhist group bought it and converted the main building into a cultural centre and the three-bay chapel into a shrine and registered place of worship. The building is Classical/Greek Revival in style, of brick and painted render, with a three-bay south façade and nine bays to the west.	
St Anne's Convent Lodge	Hove; 50.8274°N 0.1564°W		Like the adjacent villa to which it was the lodge, this building (now in residential use and known as St Michael's Lodge) dates from the early 19th century and is Classical in style. The symmetrical façade has one storey with three bays, on which a projecting Doric porch flanked by round-arched windows. At the northeast corner there is a two-storey extension.	
2, 4 and 6 St Aubyns^{[B]}	Hove; 50.8256°N 0.1780°W		.	
St Aubyns School (former)	Rottingdean; 50.8044°N 0.0575°W		.	
St Augustine's Church (More images)	Preston Park; 50.8383°N 0.1399°W		This former Anglican church, which closed in 2003, opened in 1896 and was extended in 1914. It served the areas of middle-class housing around Stanford Avenue and the south end of Preston Park. Granville Streatfield designed it in the Perpendicular Gothic style. Built of red brick with stone dressings, it has a long nave and chancel (5½ and 4 bays respectively); the latter has an apse supported by a series of flying buttresses.	
2–5 St Catherine's Terrace^{[A]}	Hove; 50.8250°N 0.1727°W		.	
St Christopher's Inn (former Princes Hotel)^{[A]} (More images)	Brighton; 50.8196°N 0.1383°W		.	
St George's Church^{[A]} (More images)	Kemp Town; 50.8182°N 0.1193°W		.	
1a–13 St George's Place^{[A]}	Brighton; 50.8273°N 0.1357°W		.	
14 St George's Place	Brighton; 50.8277°N 0.1357°W		.	
2 St George's Road	Kemptown; 50.8195°N 0.1243°W		.	
73–83 St George's Road	Kemptown; 50.8177°N 0.1184°W		.	
10 St George's Terrace^{[A]}	Kemptown; 50.8198°N 0.1254°W		.	
11–14 St George's Terrace^{[A]}	Kemptown; 50.8197°N 0.1253°W		.	
1–6 St James's Place^{[A]}	Kemptown; 50.8216°N 0.1354°W		.	
1–4 St James's Street	Kemptown; 50.8211°N 0.1358°W		.	
9 St James's Street	Kemptown; 50.8211°N 0.1353°W		.	
87 and 87a St James's Street^{[A]}	Kemptown; 50.8205°N 0.1329°W		.	
88 St James's Street	Kemptown; 50.8205°N 0.1326°W		.	
89 St James's Street	Kemptown; 50.8206°N 0.1327°W		.	
90 St James's Street	Kemptown; 50.8206°N 0.1328°W		.	
95–99 St James's Street	Kemptown; 50.8206°N 0.1333°W		.	
101 St James's Street	Kemptown; 50.8207°N 0.1336°W		.	
102 St James's Street	Kemptown; 50.8207°N 0.1337°W		.	
107–111a St James's Street^{[A]}	Kemptown; 50.8208°N 0.1343°W		.	
116 and 117 St James's Street	Kemptown; 50.8209°N 0.1352°W		.	
118 St James's Street	Kemptown; 50.8208°N 0.1353°W		.	
120 and 121 St James's Street	Kemptown; 50.8209°N 0.1355°W		.	
124 St James's Street	Kemptown; 50.8209°N 0.1358°W		.	
130 St James's Street	Kemptown; 50.8210°N 0.1362°W		.	
St John the Baptist's Church (More images)	Hove; 50.8268°N 0.1650°W		.	
St John the Evangelist's Church (More images)	Preston Village; 50.8444°N 0.1511°W		.	
1–7 St John's Place	Hove; 50.8267°N 0.1654°W		.	
St Joseph's Convent of Mercy (former) (More images)	Kemptown; 50.8191°N 0.1249°W		.	
St Joseph's Rest Home^{[A]}	Kemptown; 50.8193°N 0.1256°W		.	
St Joseph's Rest Home Chapel	Kemptown; 50.8193°N 0.1255°W		.	
St Leonard's Church (More images)	Aldrington; 50.8329°N 0.2038°W		.	
St Luke's Church (More images)	Queen's Park; 50.8276°N 0.1242°W		.	
St Luke's School (More images)	Queen's Park; 50.8270°N 0.1214°W		.	
St Luke's Swimming Baths	Queen's Park; 50.8275°N 0.1227°W		.	
10 St Luke's Terrace	Queen's Park; 50.8274°N 0.1224°W		.	
2 and 3 St Margaret's Place^{[A]}	Brighton; 50.8226°N 0.1480°W		.	
St Mark's Church (former) (More images)	Kemptown; 50.8177°N 0.1120°W		.	
St Mary's Convent (More images)	Portslade; 50.8433°N 0.2174°W		.	
St Mary's Hall School^{[G]}	Kemptown; 50.8183°N 0.1132°W		.	
St Mary's Church (More images)	Preston Park; 50.8448°N 0.1460°W		.	
St Mary Magdalen's Church^{[E]} (More images)	Brighton; 50.8255°N 0.1496°W		.	
St Mary Magdalen's Church: Clergy House^{[D]}	Brighton; 50.8255°N 0.1493°W		.	
St Mary Magdalen's Church: school buildings	Brighton; 50.8256°N 0.1499°W		.	
St Patrick's Church (More images)	Hove; 50.8260°N 0.1575°W		.	
St Peter's Church (More images)	Aldrington; 50.8334°N 0.1848°W		.	
St Peter's Church Hall	Aldrington; 50.8336°N 0.1849°W		.	
1–3 St Peter's Place	Brighton; 50.8295°N 0.1354°W		.	
4–9 St Peter's Place^{[A]}	Brighton; 50.8295°N 0.1351°W		.	
St Philip's Church (More images)	Aldrington; 50.8306°N 0.1889°W		.	
St Stephen's Schools (former) (More images)	Brighton; 50.8255°N 0.1538°W		.	
St Wilfrid's Church (former) (More images)	Elm Grove; 50.8317°N 0.1210°W		.	
Saltdean Barn^{[D]}	Saltdean; 50.8045°N 0.0408°W		The first houses in Saltdean date from the early 1920s, just before it was incorporated into the Borough of Brighton, but this barn was built no later than the mid-19th century. It retains its original cart entrance, and is built of flint dressed with red brick.	
123 Saltdean Vale	Saltdean; 50.8100°N 0.0355°W		This is another barn of the mid-19th century, originally known as Newlands Barn. The main structure and a lower section attached to the east end are both now in residential use. There is a cart entrance on the east face, and the walls are of flint dressed with red brick.	
Sassoon Mausoleum (More images)	Kemptown; 50.8178°N 0.1189°W		.	
Seat next to East Pylon	Patcham; 50.8807°N 0.1651°W		.	
Seat next to West Pylon	Patcham; 50.8806°N 0.1654°W		.	
11a Second Avenue	Hove; 50.8267°N 0.1665°W		.	
21 Second Avenue^{[E]}	Hove; 50.8254°N 0.1670°W		.	
24 Second Avenue	Hove; 50.8249°N 0.1670°W		.	
Secret Garden (More images)	Kemptown; 50.8176°N 0.1082°W		.	
Seven Stars Inn (More images)	The Lanes; 50.8223°N 0.1419°W		.	
Shelter on King's Esplanade (near Lansdowne Place)	Hove; 50.8229°N 0.1620°W		.	
Shelter on King's Esplanade (near Waterloo Street)	Hove; 50.8224°N 0.1578°W		.	
Shelter on Western Esplanade (near Berriedale Avenue)	Hove; 50.8260°N 0.1929°W		.	
Shelter on Western Esplanade (near Hove Lagoon)	Hove; 50.8264°N 0.1978°W		.	
Shelter on Western Esplanade (near Langdale Gardens)	Hove; 50.8258°N 0.1909°W		.	
Shelter opposite Eaton Place	East Cliff; 50.8163°N 0.1170°W		.	
Shelter opposite Grand Hotel	Brighton; 50.8210°N 0.1475°W		.	
Shelter opposite Lower Rock Gardens	East Cliff; 50.8190°N 0.1306°W		.	
Shelter opposite Marine Square	East Cliff; 50.8173°N 0.1221°W		.	
Shelter opposite Metropole Hotel	Brighton; 50.8212°N 0.1487°W		.	
Shelter opposite Oriental Place	Brighton; 50.8221°N 0.1540°W		.	
Shelter opposite Preston Street	Brighton; 50.8217°N 0.1516°W		.	
Shelter opposite Ship Street	Brighton; 50.8201°N 0.1422°W		.	
Shelter opposite Western Street	Brighton; 50.8225°N 0.1564°W		.	
7 Ship Street	The Lanes; 50.8209°N 0.1423°W		.	
8 Ship Street	The Lanes; 50.8210°N 0.1423°W		.	
14 Ship Street	The Lanes; 50.8213°N 0.1421°W		.	
14a Ship Street	The Lanes; 50.8214°N 0.1421°W		.	
15 Ship Street and Ship Street Chambers	The Lanes; 50.8215°N 0.1421°W		.	
16 and 17 Ship Street^{[A]}	The Lanes; 50.8216°N 0.1420°W		.	
22 Ship Street	The Lanes; 50.8219°N 0.1418°W		.	
28 and 29 Ship Street	The Lanes; 50.8224°N 0.1417°W		.	
53–55 Ship Street	The Lanes; 50.8224°N 0.1415°W		.	
57 Ship Street^{[C]}	The Lanes; 50.8221°N 0.1414°W		.	
58 Ship Street^{[A]}	The Lanes; 50.8220°N 0.1415°W		.	
59 Ship Street	The Lanes; 50.8217°N 0.1417°W		.	
62 Ship Street	The Lanes; 50.8215°N 0.1418°W		.	
63 Ship Street	The Lanes; 50.8215°N 0.1417°W		.	
64 Ship Street	The Lanes; 50.8214°N 0.1418°W		.	
68 Ship Street	The Lanes; 50.8211°N 0.1419°W		.	
69 Ship Street	The Lanes; 50.8210°N 0.1420°W		.	
13–16 Ship Street Gardens	The Lanes; 50.8215°N 0.1423°W		.	
1–8 Sillwood Place	Brighton; 50.8236°N 0.1528°W		.	
9 Sillwood Place^{[A]}	Brighton; 50.8238°N 0.1526°W		.	
10 and 11 Sillwood Place	Brighton; 50.8239°N 0.1526°W		.	
13 and 14 Sillwood Road	Brighton; 50.8238°N 0.1514°W		.	
32–47 Sillwood Road^{[E]}	Brighton; 50.8239°N 0.1518°W		.	
Smugglers Inn	The Lanes; 50.8211°N 0.1423°W		.	
South African War Memorial (More images)	Brighton; 50.8218°N 0.1507°W		.	
South Gate of the Royal Pavilion^{[F]} (More images)	Brighton; 50.8223°N 0.1383°W		.	
7, 9 and 11 South Road	Preston Village; 50.8422°N 0.1520°W		.	
Stable block at Patcham Place	Patcham; 50.8647°N 0.1532°W		.	
Stables at Ovingdean Grange (former)	Ovingdean; 50.8165°N 0.0758°W		.	
Stables at The Timbers (former)	Rottingdean; 50.8067°N 0.0596°W		.	
Stag's Head pub (More images)	Portslade; 50.8432°N 0.2205°W		.	
Stanford Junior School^{[G]} (More images)	Prestonville; 50.8358°N 0.1476°W		.	
Stanmer Church (More images)	Stanmer; 50.8703°N 0.1019°W		.	
1 and 2 Stanmer Park	Stanmer; 50.8723°N 0.1019°W		.	
3–6 Stanmer Park	Stanmer; 50.8726°N 0.1020°W		.	
7–10 Stanmer Park	Stanmer; 50.8726°N 0.1016°W		.	
13–16 Stanmer Park	Stanmer; 50.8721°N 0.1016°W		.	
Stanmer Park Lower Lodge (north) (More images)	Stanmer; 50.8619°N 0.0930°W		.	
Stanmer Park Lower Lodge (south) (More images)	Stanmer; 50.8618°N 0.0932°W		.	
Star Inn (More images)	Kemptown; 50.8207°N 0.1357°W		.	
Statue of King Edward VII (Peace Memorial) (More images)	Brighton; 50.8225°N 0.1570°W		.	
Statue of King George IV (More images)	Brighton; 50.8234°N 0.1369°W		.	
Statue of Queen Victoria, Grand Avenue (More images)	Hove; 50.8246°N 0.1693°W		.	
Statue of Queen Victoria, Victoria Gardens (More images)	Brighton; 50.8238°N 0.1366°W		.	
Statue of Sir John Cordy Burrows (More images)	Brighton; 50.8204°N 0.1379°W		.	
Steine House^{[G]} (More images)	Brighton; 50.8212°N 0.1384°W		.	
1 Steine Lane^{[A]}	Brighton; 50.8213°N 0.1384°W		.	
13a and 14 Stone Street	Brighton; 50.8241°N 0.1504°W		.	
Store shed at Stanmer Park	Stanmer; 50.8695°N 0.1043°W		.	
Studio at St Margaret's School (former)	Rottingdean; 50.8062°N 0.0566°W		.	
Sunken Garden at White Lodge	Roedean; 50.8145°N 0.0977°W		.	
Sussex Masonic Club	Brighton; 50.8257°N 0.1429°W		.	
Sussex Tavern (More images)	The Lanes; 50.8213°N 0.1395°W		.	

== See also ==
- Buildings and architecture of Brighton and Hove
- Grade I listed buildings in Brighton and Hove
- Grade II* listed buildings in Brighton and Hove
- List of conservation areas in Brighton and Hove
