= Statue of Queen Victoria, Brighton =

Statue in Brighton, England

Statue of Queen Victoria
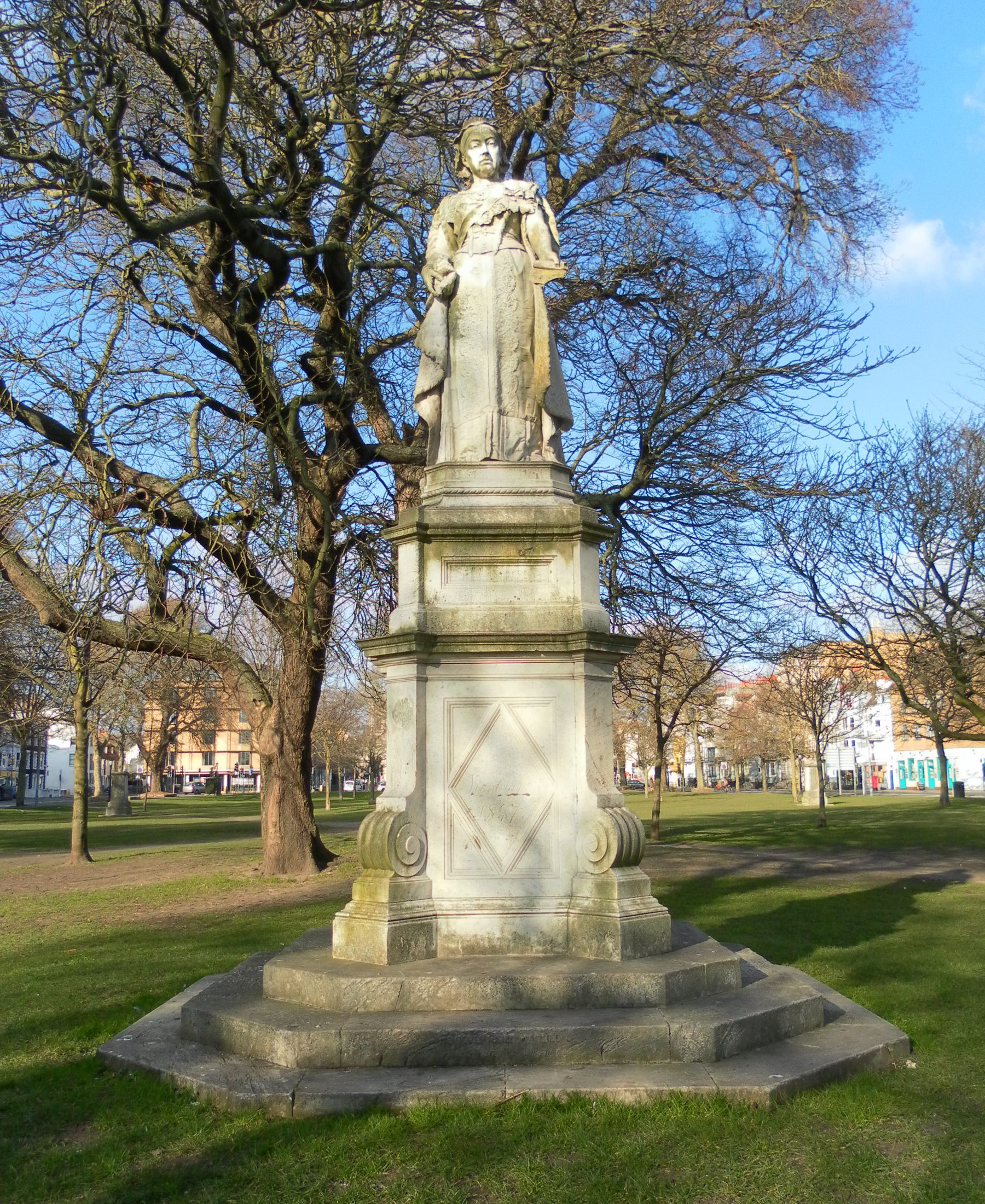
- The statue in 2013
- Artist: Carlo Nicoli
- Year: 1897
- Completion date: 8 December
- Medium: Marble
- Subject: Queen Victoria
- Location: Brighton, England; 50°49′26″N 0°08′12″W

The Statue of Queen Victoria stands in Victoria Gardens in the centre of Brighton on the south coast of England. It was unveiled in 1897, the year of Victoria's diamond jubilee and is a Grade II listed building.

== History ==
Multiple statues of Queen Victoria were erected in Britain and its empire (especially India) around her golden and diamond jubilees. Brighton's was commissioned by the town's mayor, Sir John George Blaker. It was designed by the Italian sculptor Carlo Nicoli and built by the Sculptured Marble Company of London (a subsidiary of the Statuary and Granite Company), which offered several stock designs for statues of Victoria.

Blaker announced the gift of the statue on the date of Victoria's diamond jubilee, 22 June 1897, and his daughter unveiled it on 8 December. The park in which it is situated was known as North Steine Gardens and open only to subscribers but was opened to the public to mark the jubilee, and was renamed Victoria Gardens at the same time as the statue was unveiled. The gardens are divided into two sections; the statue stands in the centre of the southern part.

The unveiling ceremony concluded with a military tattoo. The statue has suffered graffiti multiple times since its inception. Victoria's left arm was severed in 2022; the cause of the damage was unknown.

It has been a Grade II listed building since 1971, a legal status which provides protection from demolition or unauthorised modification.

== Description ==
The statue is executed in Carrara marble. It is a copy of one that stood in Amritsar, India, which Nicoli produce in 1888. Victoria is depicted true to life, in an aged state, at a state Opening of Parliament. She is wearing the sash of the Order of the Garter and a veil beneath her crown, and is holding an unrolled scroll in her left hand. The scroll is a reference to Victoria's assumption of direct rule over India. The statue is 2.5 metres (8 feet 2 inches) high and stands on a plinth of the same height, then a base of three octagonal steps. The base is decorated with a sculpted braid along the top plinth and scrolls at the corners. Victoria is depicted life-like in her elderly state and is not idealised. She faces the statue of George IV (her uncle), and the Indian-style Royal Pavilion, though she profoundly disliked the building.

Nicoli relied on photographs of the queen for the sculpture. The statue was well-received locally at its unveiling but The Magazine of Art was extremely critical, saying that the work "impresses us neither as a portrait nor as an example of sculpture" and derided it as a "commercial sculpture". The magazine noted that Nicoli did not sign the work (only the company's name appears on the work) and suggested that he was ashamed to put his name to it.

== See also ==
- Statue of Queen Victoria, Hove (1901)
- List of statues of Queen Victoria
- List of public art in Brighton and Hove
- Grade II listed buildings in Brighton and Hove: S
