= Royal Sussex Regiment Memorial, Brighton =

War memorial in Brighton and Hove, England

Royal Sussex Regiment Memorial
- United Kingdom
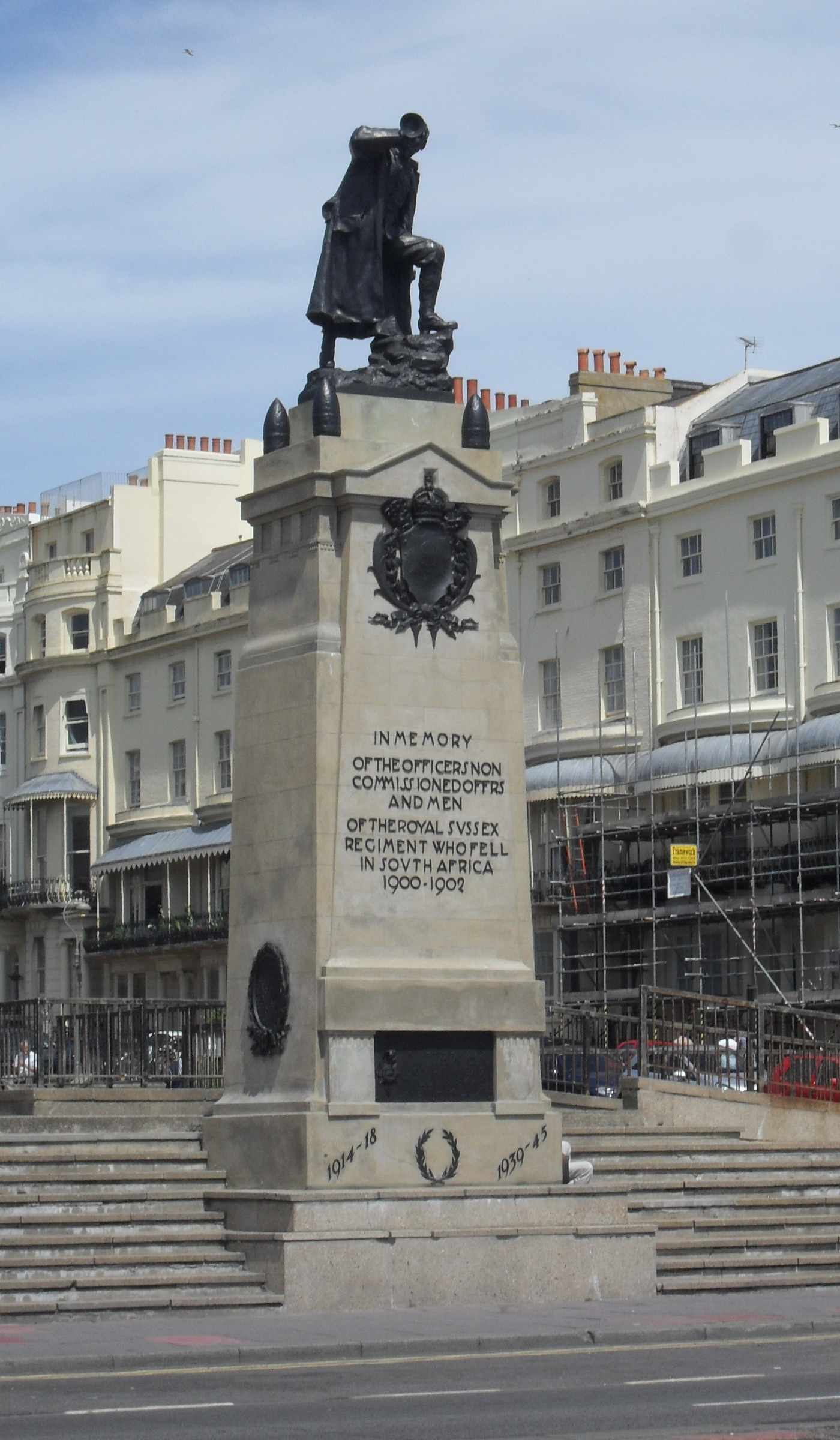
- For casualties of the Royal Sussex Regiment
- Unveiled: 29 October 1904
- Location: 50°49′19″N 0°09′03″W; Regency Square, Brighton, England
- Designed by: John William Simpson

Listed Building – Grade II
- Official name: South African War Memorial
- Designated: 13 October 1952
- Reference no.: 1380815

The Royal Sussex Regiment Memorial, also known as The Bugler and the South African War Memorial, is a war memorial on Regency Square in Brighton, on the south coast of England. It commemorates casualties of the Royal Sussex Regiment in the Second Boer War and other campaigns at the end of the 19th century.

== Design ==
The memorial stands at the southern end of Regency Square, an upmarket housing development to the west of the centre of Brighton. It consists of a statue of a soldier from the Royal Sussex Regiment on a substantial plinth and faces the sea. The soldier is playing the bugle, an allusion to a real event at the Battle of Doornkop, a major event in the Second Boer War. The figure was modelled on a real sergeant from the regiment. The plinth is decorated laurel wreaths and bears the dedicatory inscription: "In memory of the officer, non-commissioned officers, and men of the Royal Sussex Regiment who fell in South Africa 1900–1902". The names and dates of other battles and campaigns are inscribed around the bottom of the plinth: Louisbourg/Quebec 1759, Maida/Egypt 1882, Nile 1884–5, Abu Klea. The dates of the two world wars were added following those conflicts.

The plinth is rectangular in plan and tapers towards the top, where the four corners are marked by artillery shells. Bronze plaques contain lists of names.

== History ==
The monument was erected to the memory of the Royal Sussex's casualties in the Second Boer War but includes dedications to other conflicts from around the turn of the 20th century. The memorial was designed by the local architect John William Simpson and the statue was sculpted by Charles Leonard Hartwell, whose signature is on the base. The contractors were B&W Bennett of Lewes Road, Brighton. The memorial was unveiled by William Nevill, 1st Marquess of Abergavenny, the Lord Lieutenant of Sussex, on 29 October 1904. Regency Square was filled with soldiers for the ceremony, to the extent that the Brighton Herald described it as being "under military occupation".

The memorial cost £1,400 of which £803 was contributed from the regiment's funds; the remainder was raised by public subscription. It is maintained by Brighton and Hove City Council. Since 1952, it has been a Grade II listed building; listed building status provides legal protection from unauthorised demolition or modification and is applied to structures of historical and architectural importance.

== See also ==
- Peace Statue, Brighton (1912), another monument a short distance to the west
- Royal Sussex Memorial, Eastbourne (1906), contemporary memorial to the same regiment in Eastbourne
- Grade II listed buildings in Brighton and Hove: S
- List of public art in Brighton and Hove
