= Joseph Henry Good =

English architect

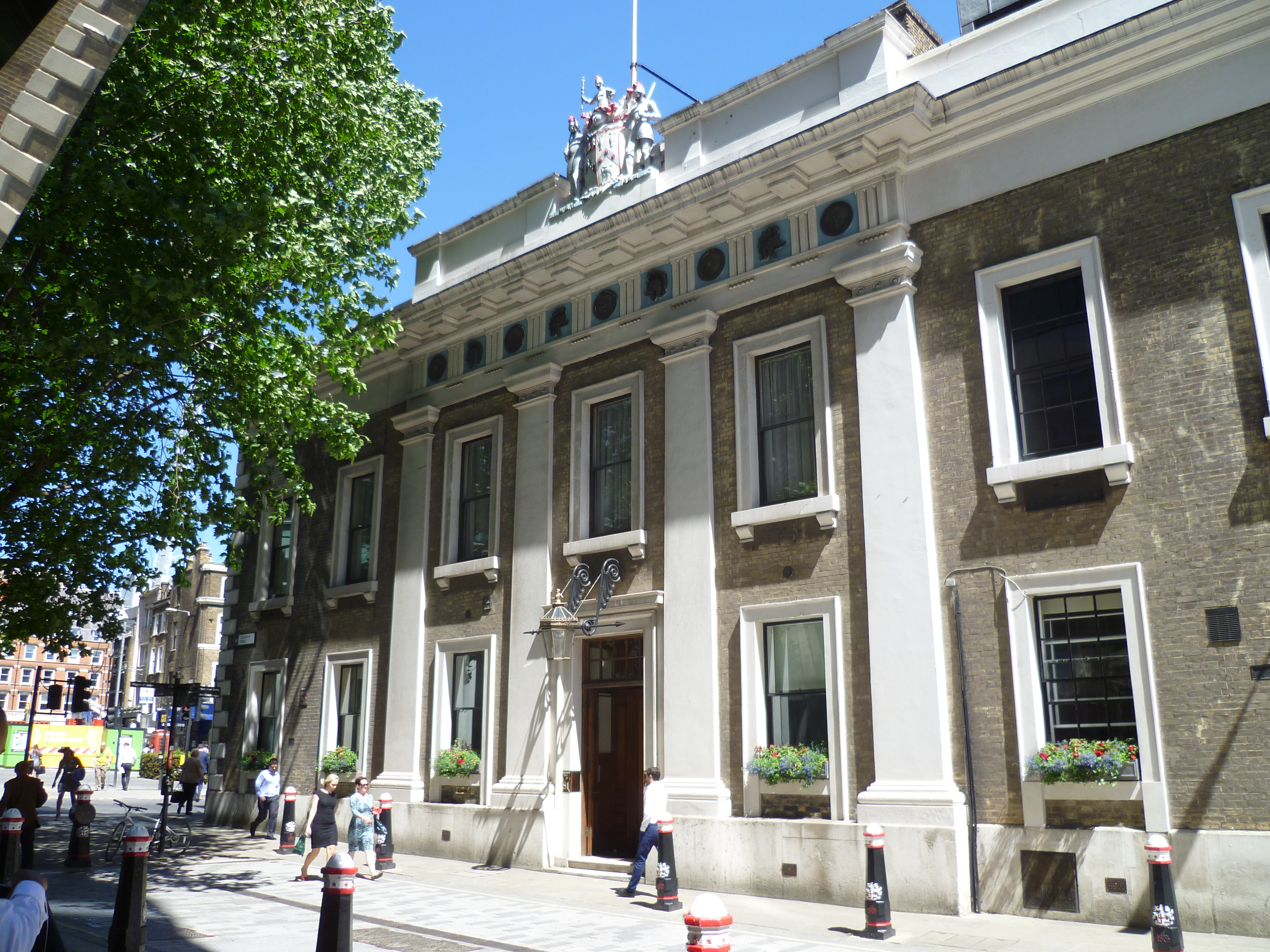
Armourers' Hall, London.

Joseph Henry Good (1775-1857) was an English architect who was clerk of works at the Tower of London, Royal Mint, Kensington Palace and the Royal Pavilion Brighton.

== Early life ==
Good was born in 1775, the son of the Reverend Joseph Good, a Somerset clergyman.

== Career ==
Good was a pupil of Sir John Soane from 1795 to 1799. He became clerk of works at the Tower of London, Royal Mint, Kensington Palace and the Royal Pavilion Brighton, and designed Armourers' Hall in Coleman Street, London (1839–41).

== Death ==
Good died on 20 November 1857. He is buried at Kensal Green Cemetery.
