= North Gate of the Royal Pavilion =

Architectural structure in Brighton, England

Coordinates: 50°49′25″N 0°08′14″W

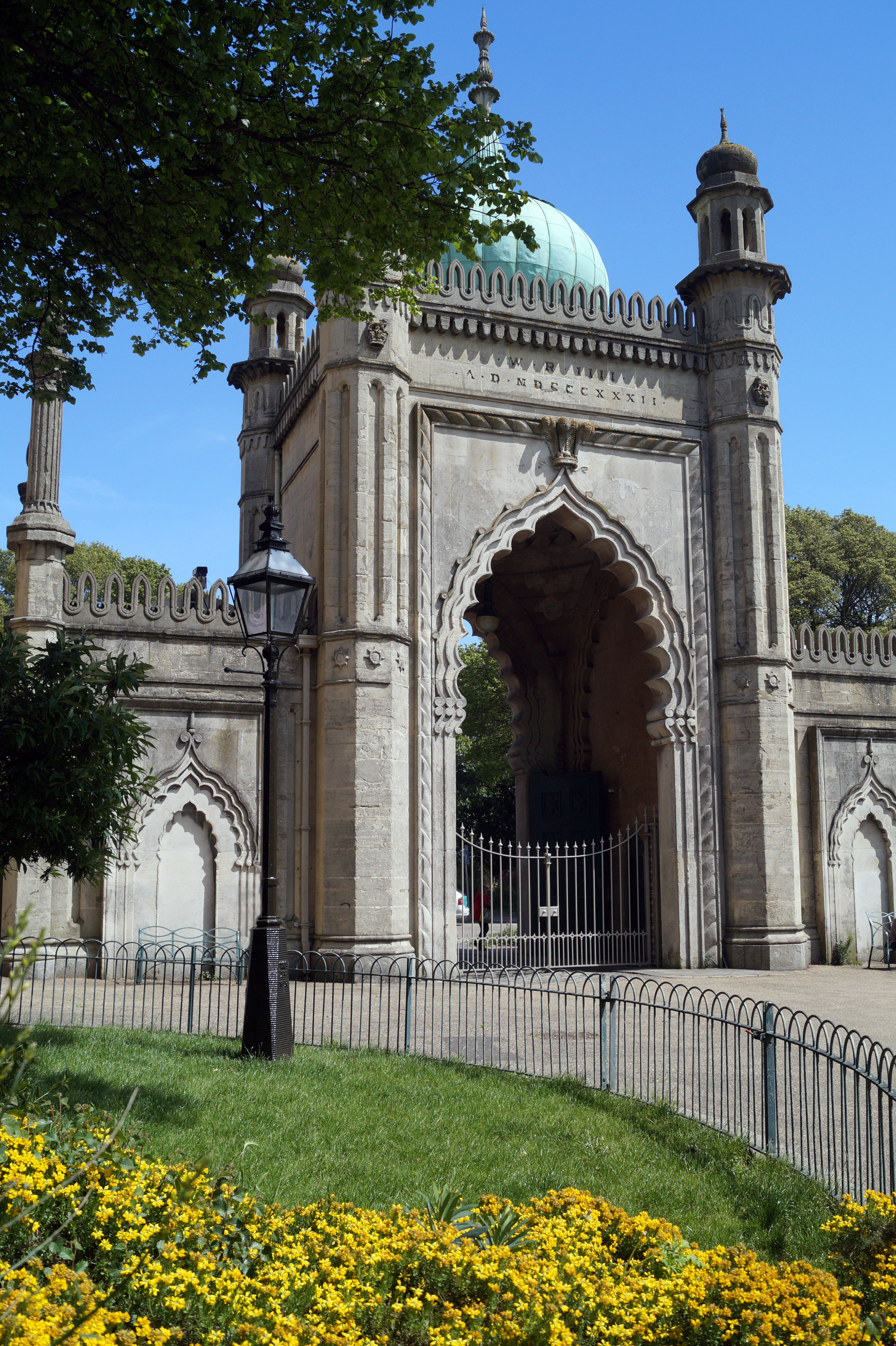
The North Gate

The North Gate of the Royal Pavilion is a Grade II* listed building in Brighton, England. It is part of the Valley Gardens conservation area. Dating from 1832, it is in the Oriental style, as the main Brighton Pavilion, however it was designed by architect and surveyor Joseph Henry Good, not John Nash the architect of the Pavilion and built in the reign of William IV.
