= Peter Webster (artist) =

English artist and sculptor

Peter Webster is an English artist and sculptor, best known for his sculpture of the British athlete Steve Ovett, which was exhibited in Preston Park, Brighton, before its theft. Webster created a replacement which was installed on Brighton seafront in 2012 as part of the celebrations for the London Olympics.

Webster also created the statue of Max Miller, the English comedian, currently on display in the grounds of the Royal Pavilion, Brighton. This statue was unveiled on 1 May 2005 by the Mayor of Brighton, Pat Drake.
