= The Lanes =

Shopping and residential district in Brighton, England (Laines)

Coordinates: 50.821°N 0.140°W

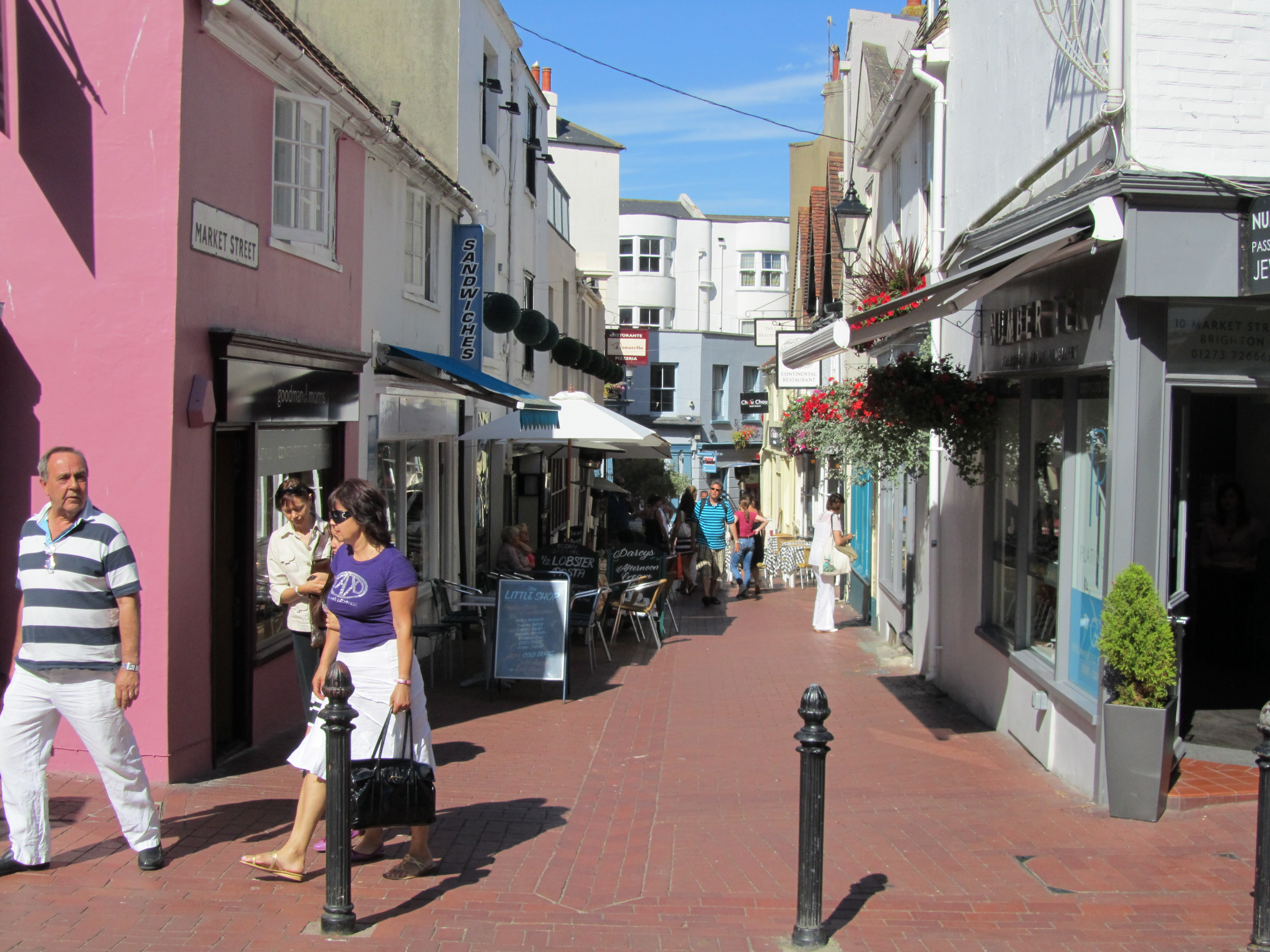
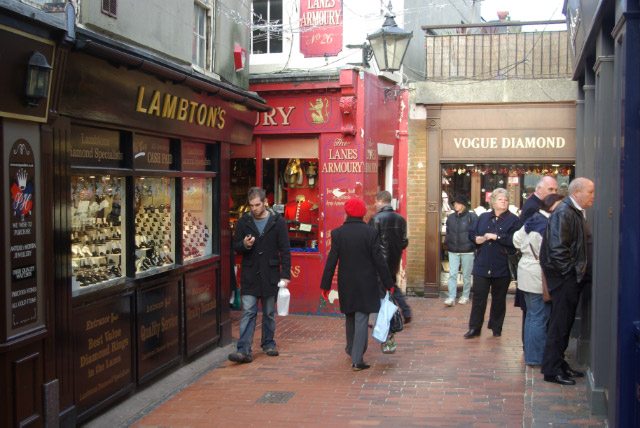
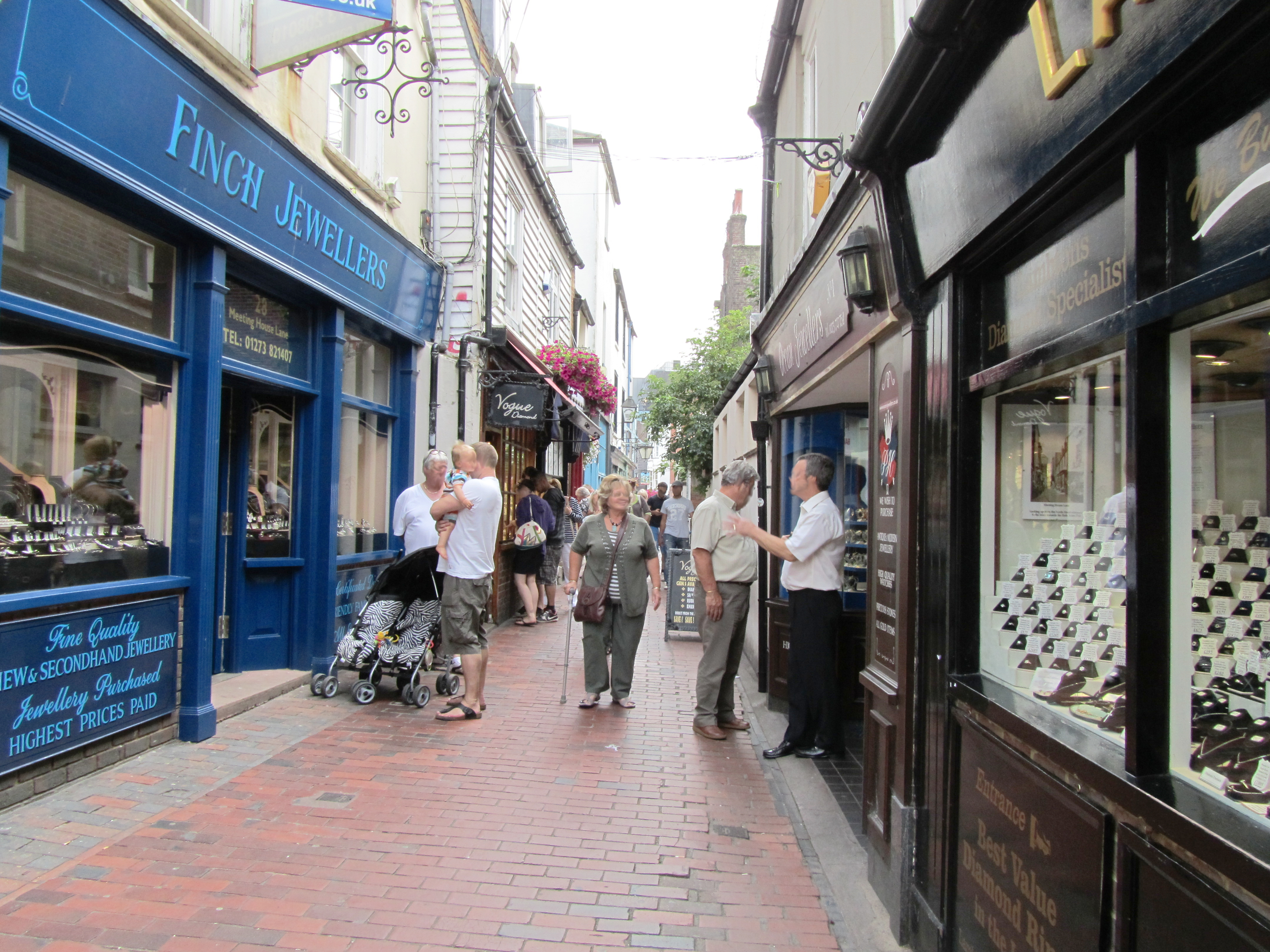
Selected lanes within the retail district

The Lanes are a collection of narrow lanes in the city of Brighton and Hove, famous for their small shops (including several antique shops) and narrow alleyways.

The Lanes are commonly taken to be bounded by North Street to the north, Ship Street to the west and Prince Albert Street and the north side of Bartholomew Square to the south. The eastern boundary is less well-defined and can be considered either East Street or Market Street.

Meeting House Lane is one of the wider lanes which meets with the busy shopping road of North Street and eventually winds around to Market Street. The north end of Meeting House Lane meets North Street a few yards down the road from the southern end of North Laine which is not part of the Lanes.

== History ==
The area that is now the Lanes was part of the original settlement of Brighthelmstone, but they were built up during the late 18th century and were fully laid out by 1792 which was after the supposed benefits of sea water had been publicised by Dr Richard Russell of Lewes, but before the Prince Regent made Brighton one of his homes by developing the Royal Pavilion.

Unlike many of the other lanes in this oldest part of Brighton, Dukes Lane, which leads off of Duke Street, was a "reproduction street" constructed in 1979 and is relatively new.
