= Carlo Nicoli =

Italian sculptor (1843–1915)

- Born: October 4, 1843; Carrara, Tuscany
- Died: November 2, 1915 (aged 72); Carrara, Italy
- Education: Accademia di Belle Arti di Firenze
- Known for: Sculpturing
- Awards: Gold Medal, Florence Art Exhibition (1868); Knight of the Order of Charles III

Carlo Nicoli (4 October 1843 – 2 November 1915) was an Italian sculptor.

Nicoli was born in Carrara, Tuscany, into a family of sculptors. He studied at the Fine Arts Academy there before moving to Florence. There, he was apprenticed to Giovanni Dupré. In 1868, he won the gold medal at the Florence Art Exhibition for a small sculpture, The Beggar. Two years later, he carved L'angelo Sorvegliatore, which was criticised at the time, though later won him recognition. It caught the attention of King Alfonso XII of Spain and led to several commissions there. Nicoli was knighted in the Spanish Order of Charles III. He sculpted several copies of The Beggar, one of which was purchased by the Spanish Education Board.

Nicoli moved back to Carrara in 1875 and was appointed an honorary professor at the art academy. In 1876, he completed a statue of the Spanish author Miguel de Cervantes for his birthplace of Alcalá de Henares, and two years later sculpted a seated figure of Cervantes. In 1885, Nicoli became the permanent sculpture teacher at the Carrara academy after the death of his predecessor, Demetrio Carusi. After Nicoli's death, his workshop in Carrara was preserved by his family.

== Selected works ==
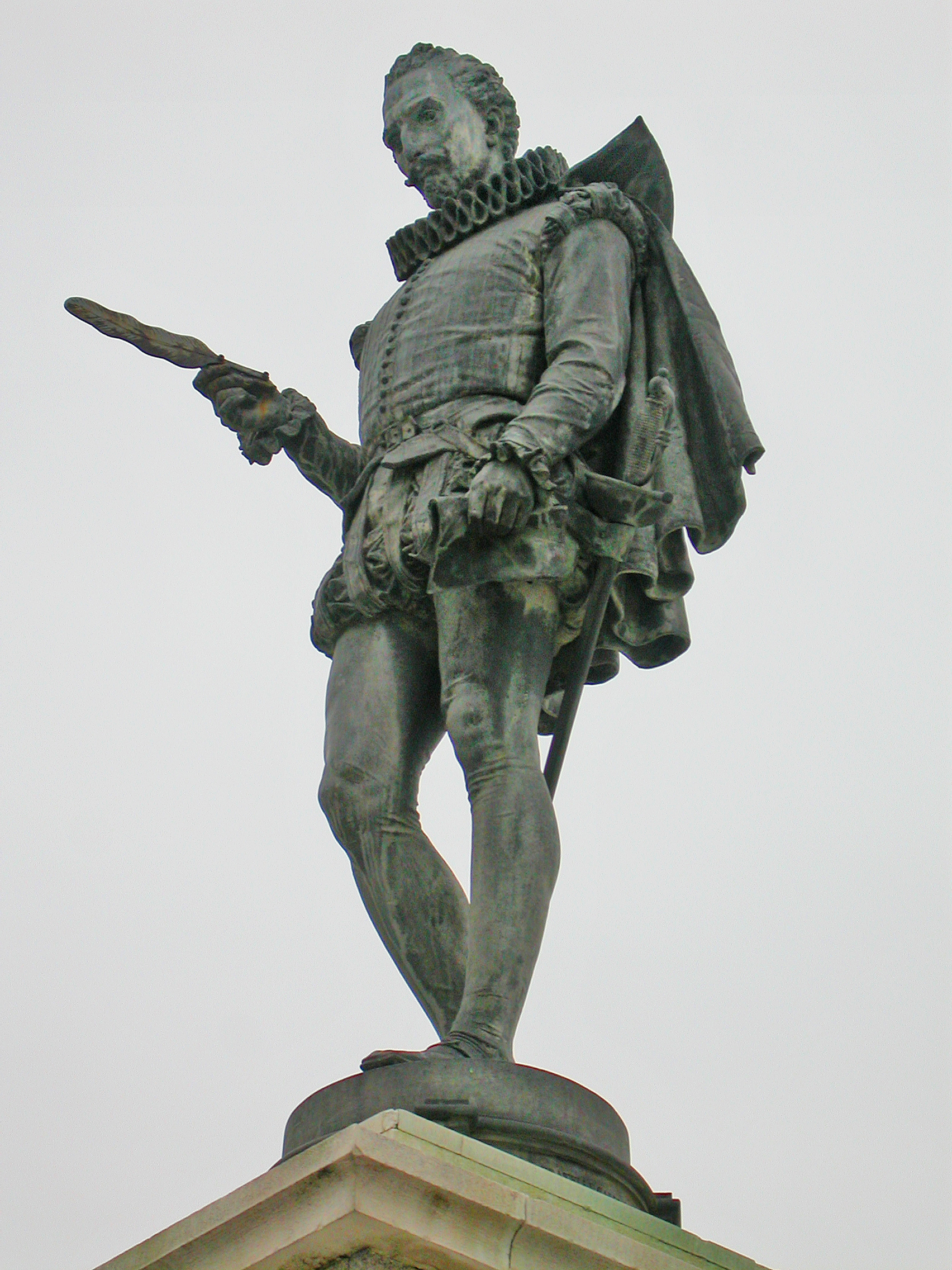
Cervantes Statue, Alcalá de Henares, Spain

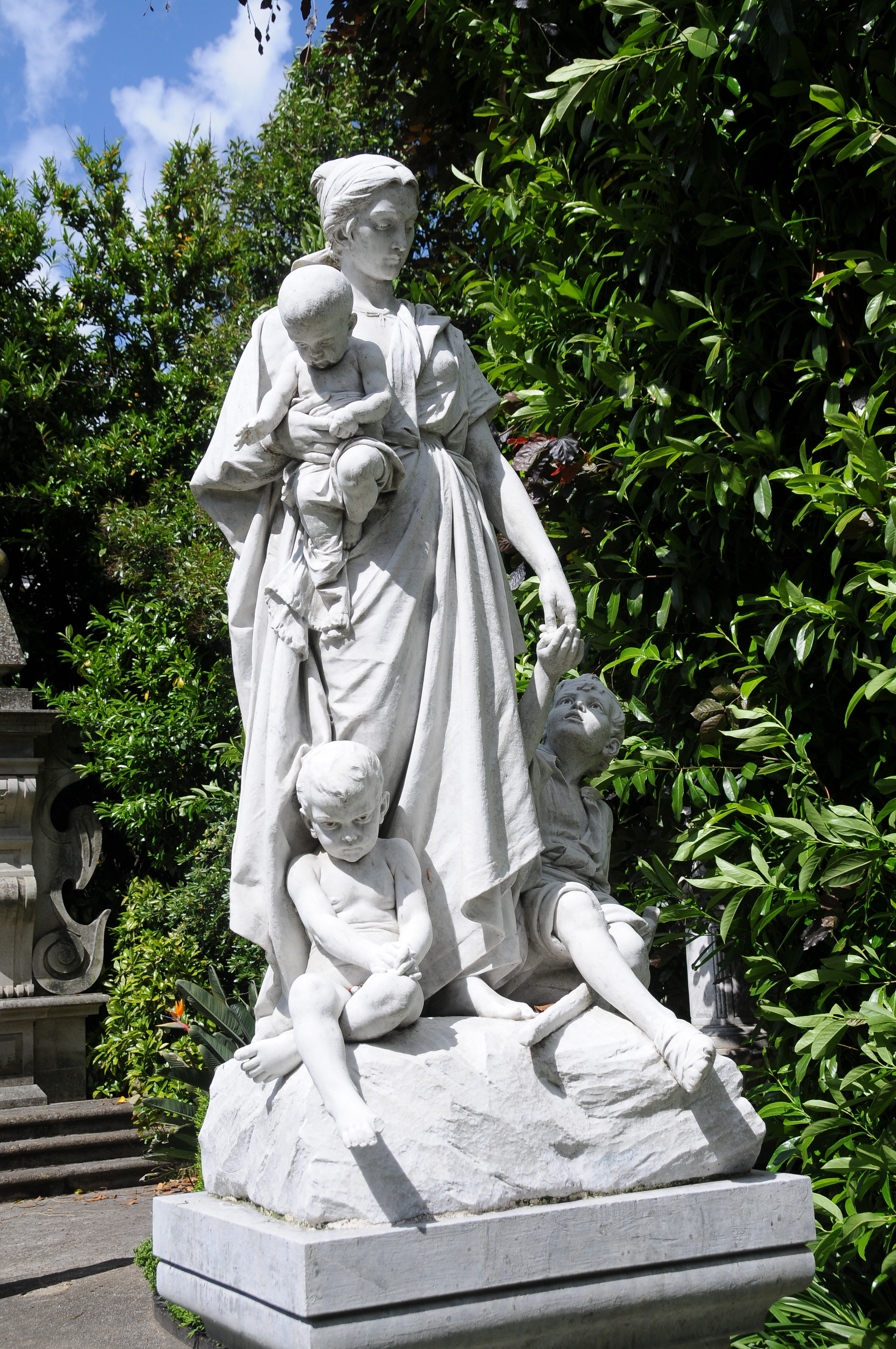
Charity, Nogueira da Silva Museum, Portugal

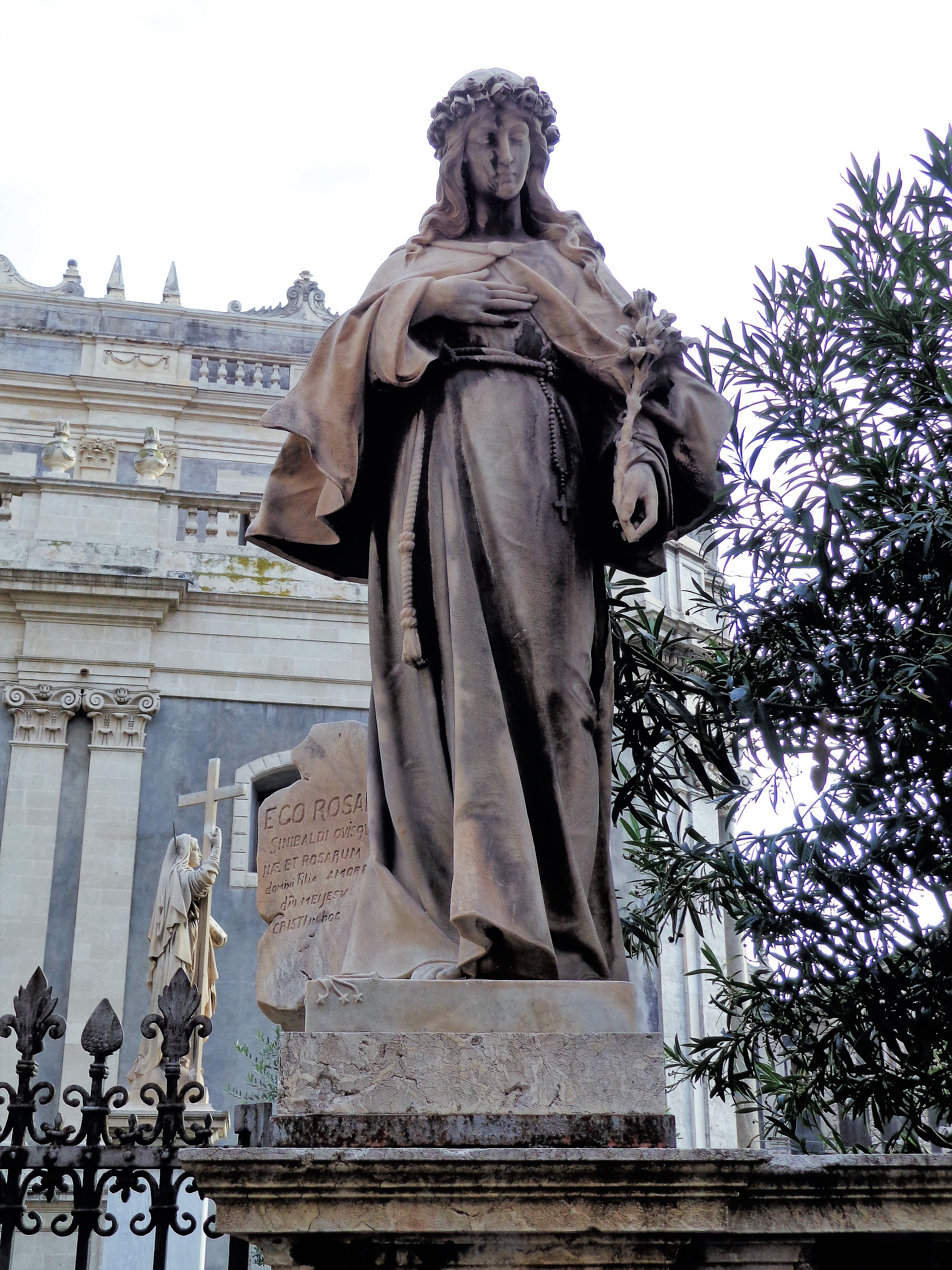
Rosalia Sinibaldi, Catania Cathedral, Italy

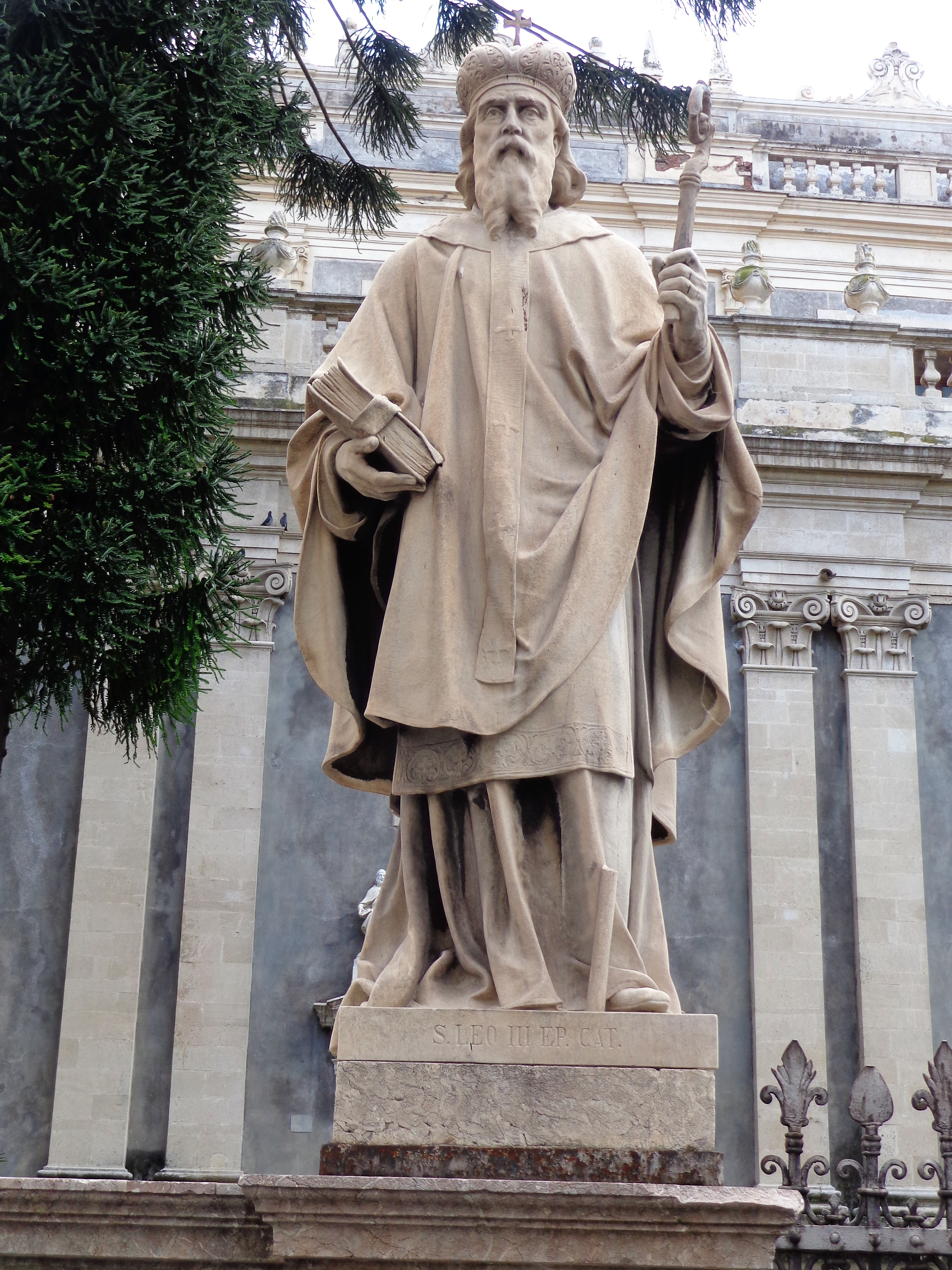
San Leo III, Catania Cathedral

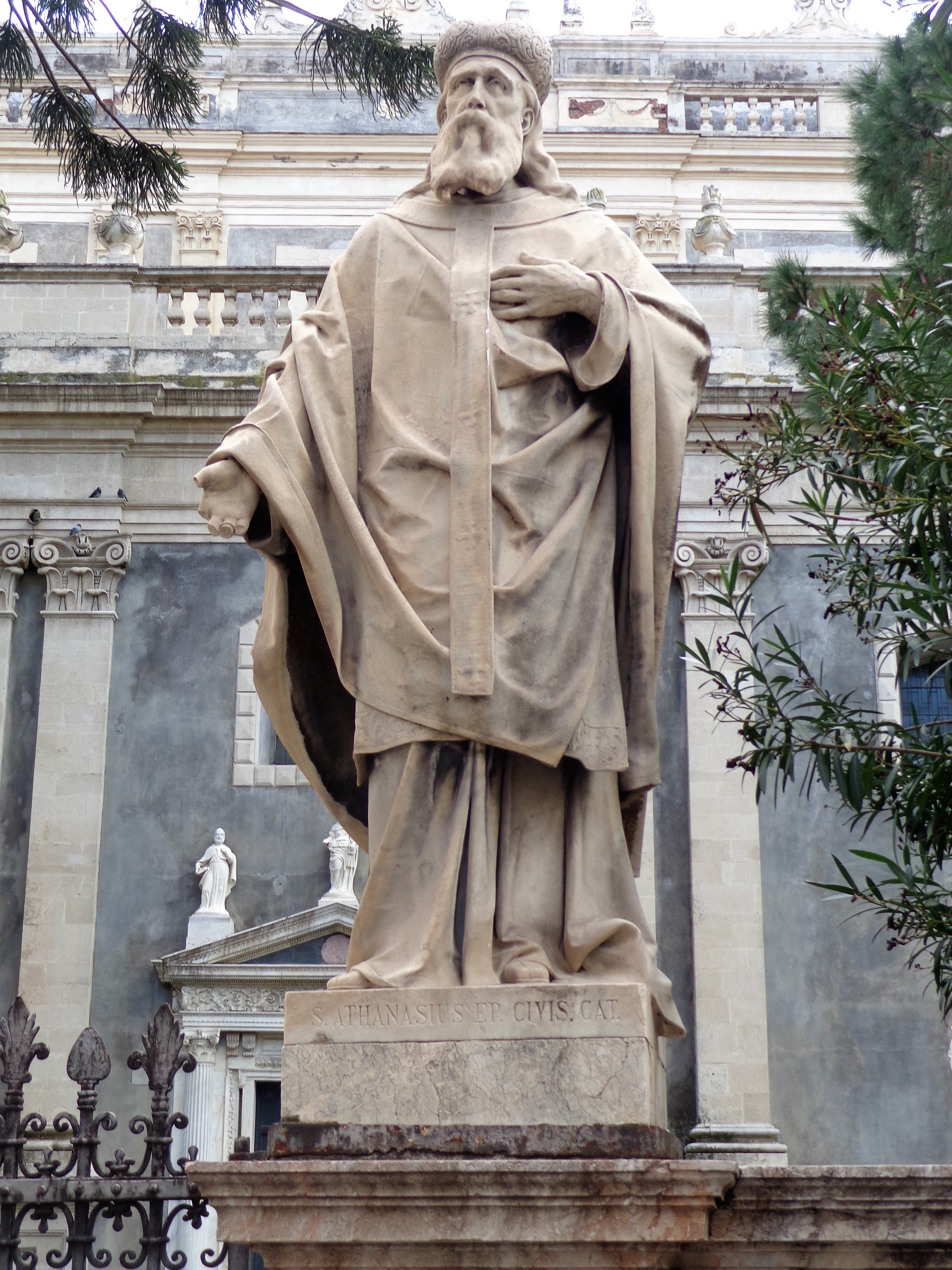
Sant'Atanasio, Catania Cathedral

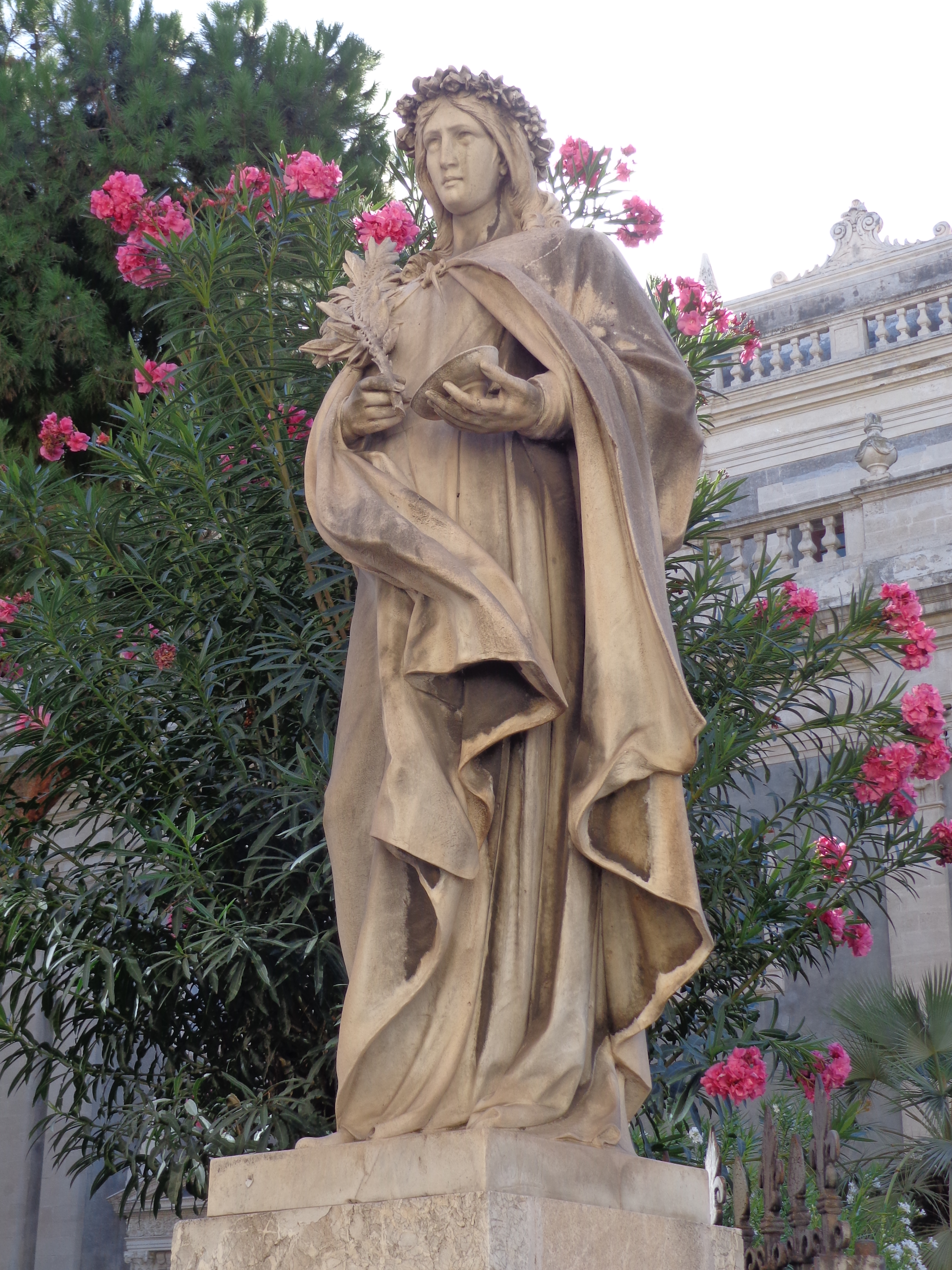
Santa Lucia, Catania Cathedral

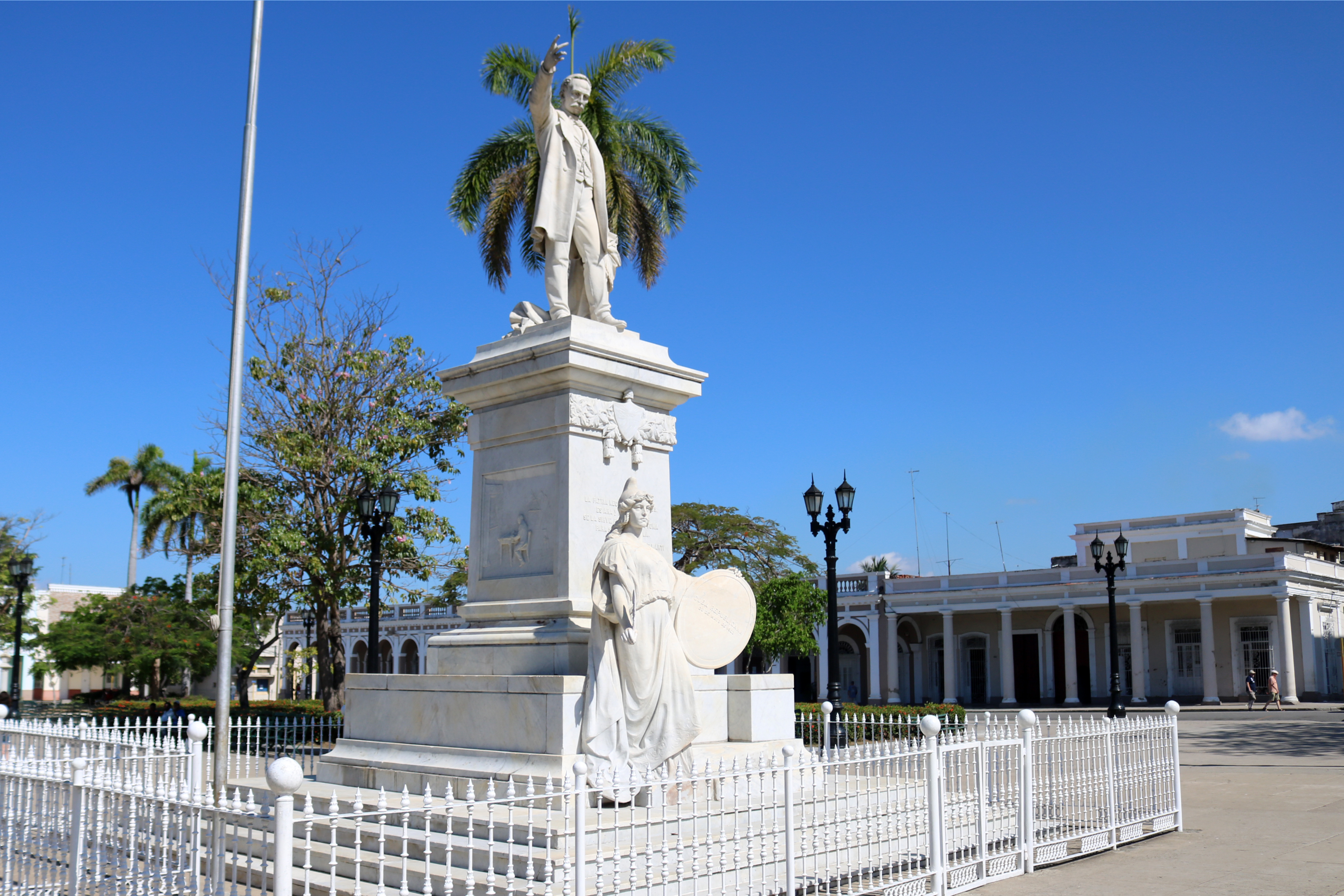
José Martí, Cienfuegos, Cuba

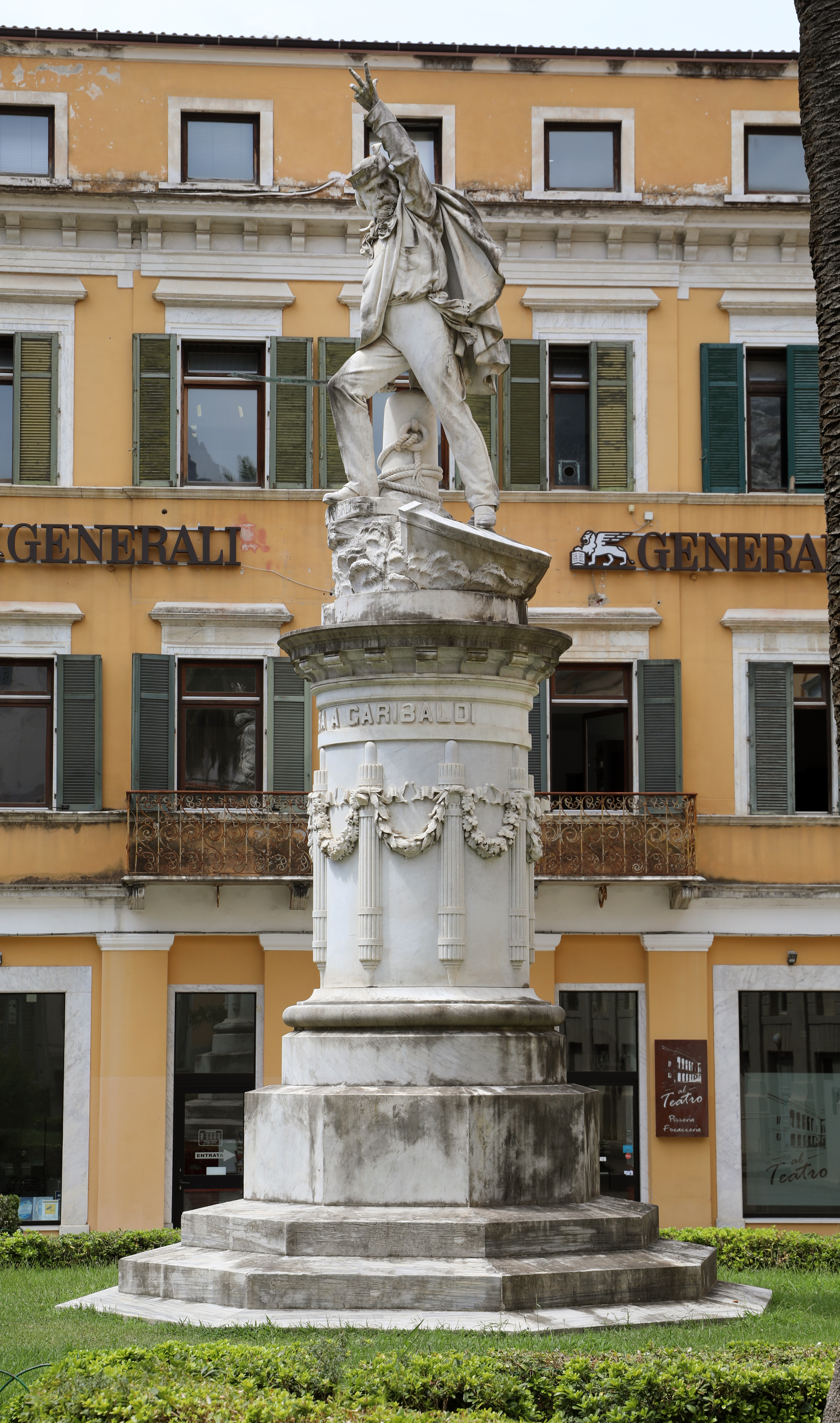
Giuseppe Garibaldi, Carrara, Italy

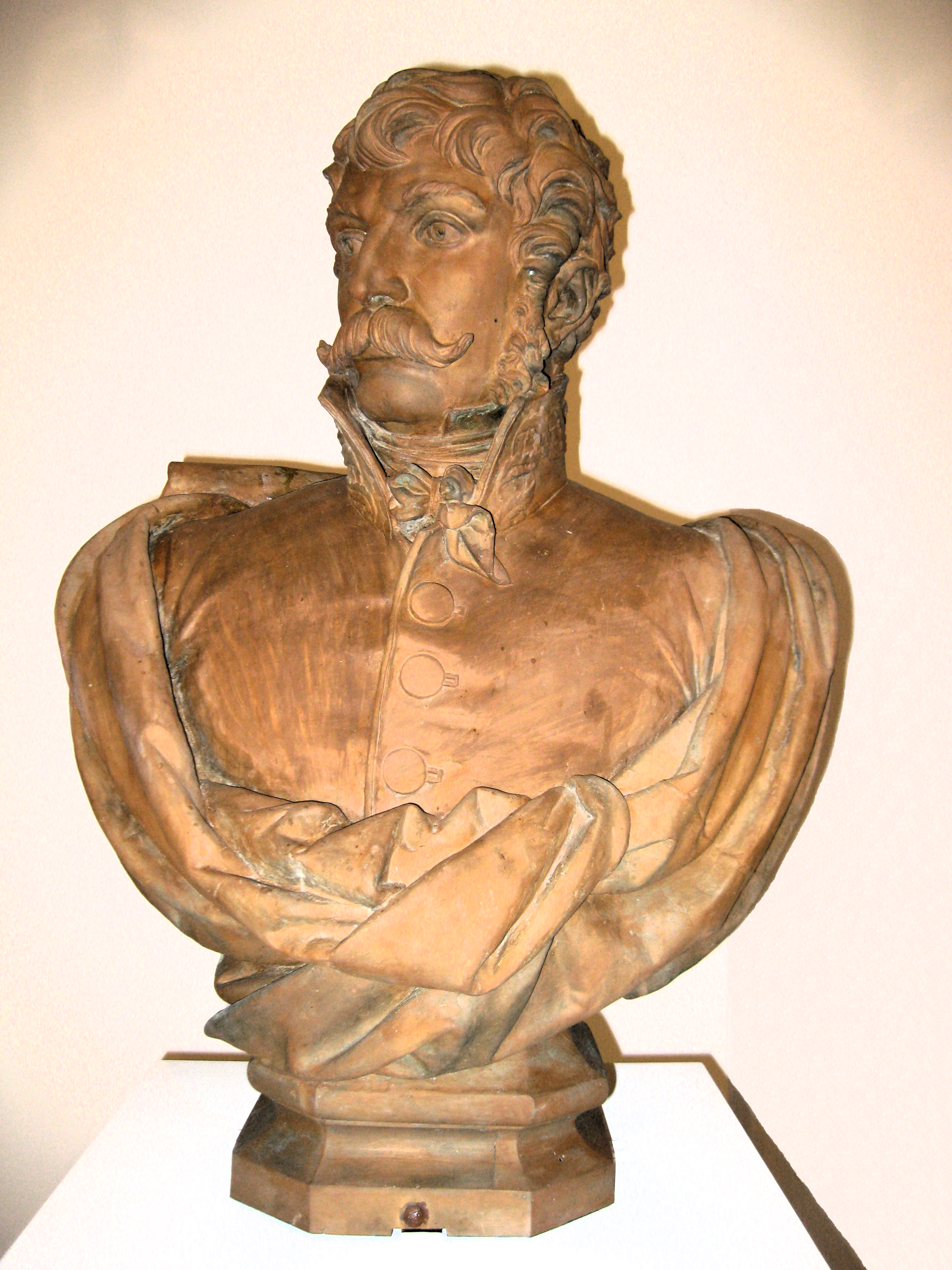
Juan Martín Díez, Alcalá de Henares, Spain

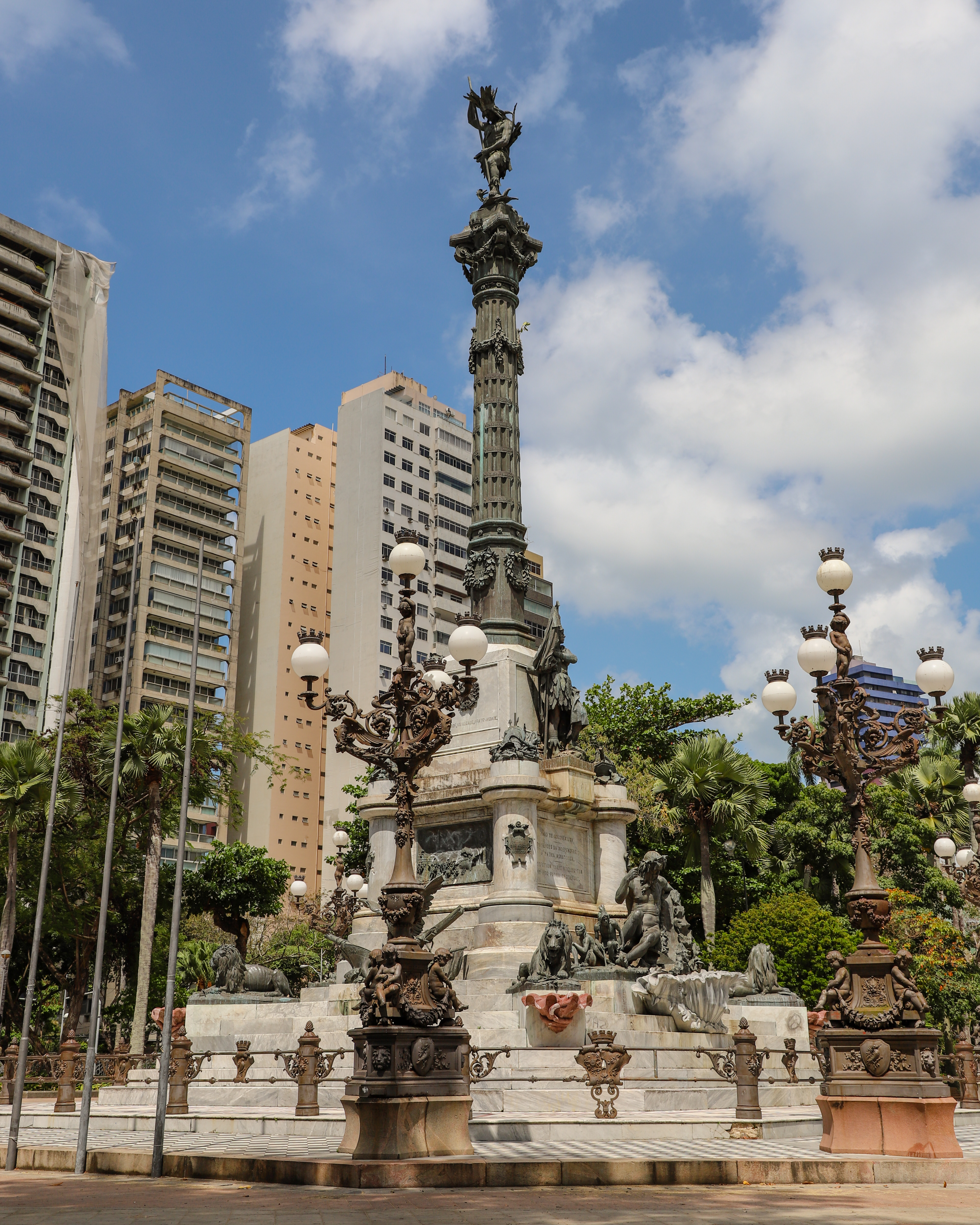
Salvador, Brazil

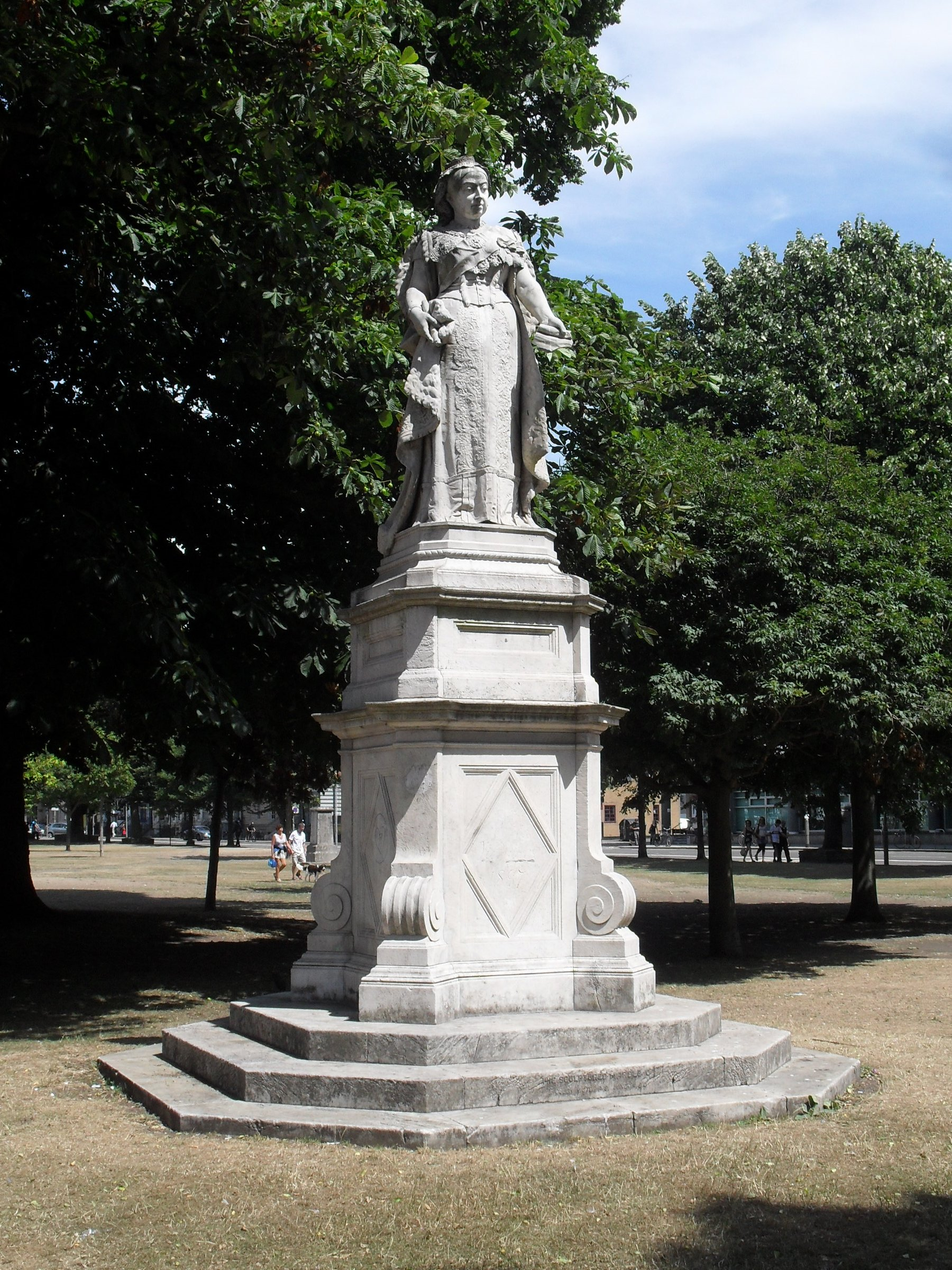
Statue of Queen Victoria, Brighton, England
