= Royal Pavilion =

Former royal residence in Brighton, England

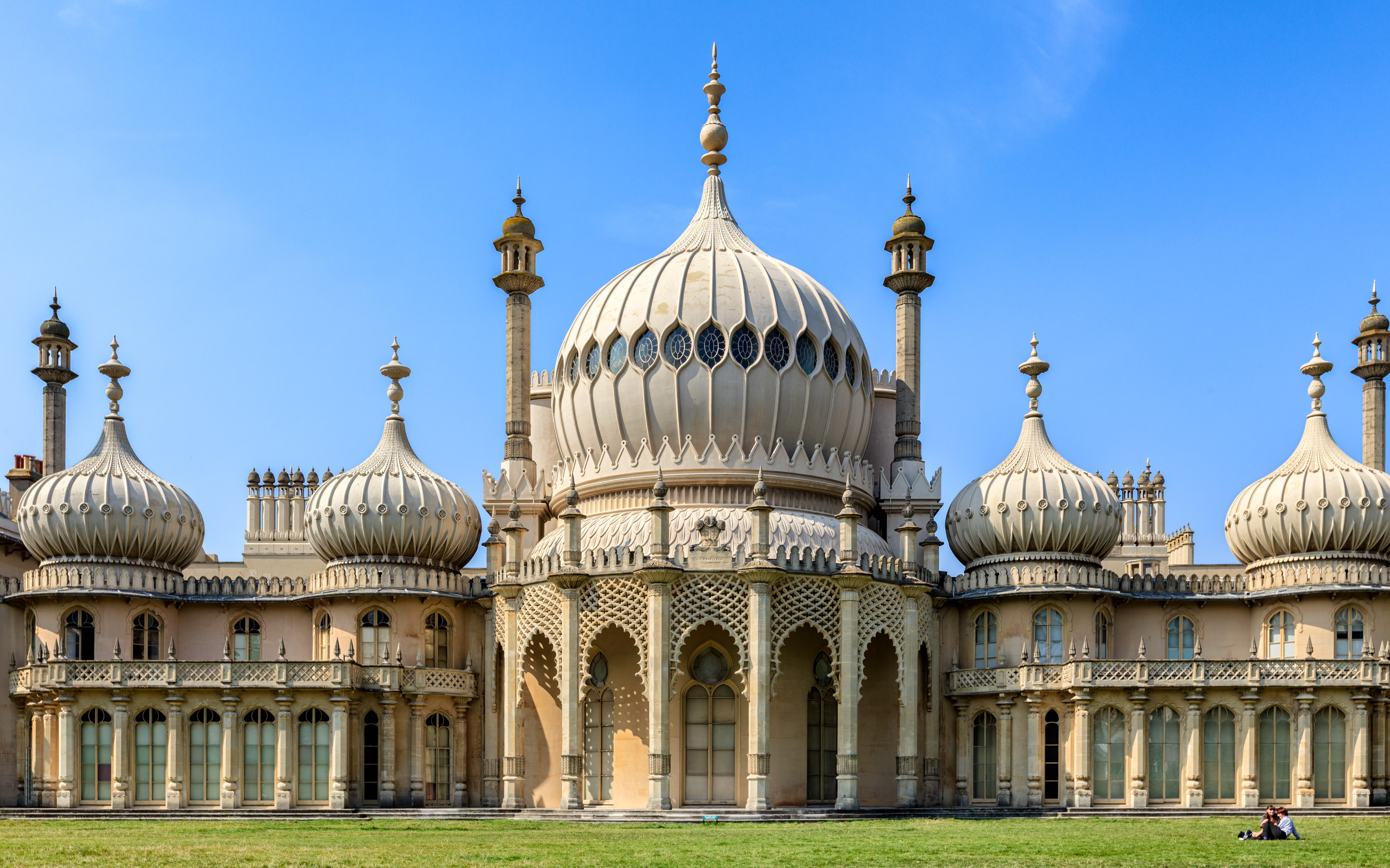
- View of the Royal Pavilion

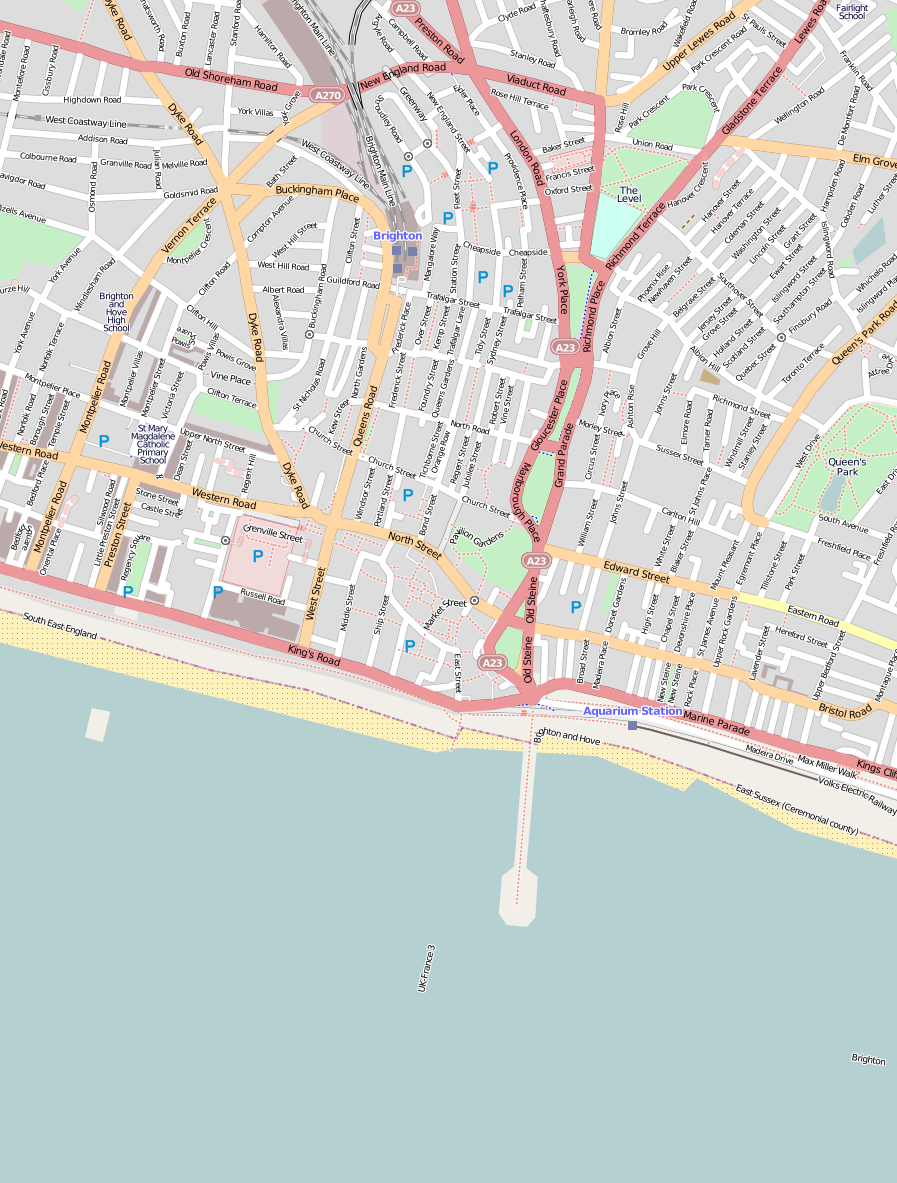
- Location within Brighton

General information
- Type: Palace
- Architectural style: Indo-Saracenic Revival
- Location: Brighton, England
- Coordinates: 50°49′23″N 0°08′15″W
- Construction started: 1787
- Completed: 1823
- Owner: Royal Pavilion & Museums Trust

Design and construction
- Architect: John Nash

Website
- Royal Pavilion

Listed Building – Grade I
- Official name: The Royal Pavilion
- Designated: 13 October 1952
- Reference no.: 1380680

National Register of Historic Parks and Gardens
- Official name: The Royal Pavilion, Brighton
- Type: Grade II
- Designated: 25 March 1987
- Reference no.: 1000205

The Royal Pavilion (also known as the Brighton Pavilion) and its surrounding gardens form a Grade I listed former royal residence in Brighton, England. Beginning in 1787, it was built in three stages as a seaside retreat for George, Prince of Wales, who became the Prince Regent in 1811, and King George IV in 1820. It is built in the Indo-Saracenic style prevalent in India for most of the 19th century. The current appearance, with its Mughal inspired features such as bulbous domes, chhatri-topped minarets and cusped arches, is the work of the architect John Nash, who extended the building starting in 1815. George IV's successors William IV and Victoria also used the Pavilion, but Queen Victoria decided that Osborne House should be the royal seaside retreat, and the Pavilion was sold to the city of Brighton in 1850.

== History ==
The Prince of Wales, who later became King George IV, first visited Brighton in 1783, at the age of 21. The seaside town had become fashionable as a result of the residence of George's uncle, Prince Henry, Duke of Cumberland, whose tastes for fine cuisine, gambling, the theatre, and general fast living the young prince shared, and with whom he lodged in Brighton at Grove House. In addition, the Prince of Wales was advised by his physician that the seawater and fresh air would be beneficial for his gout. In 1786, under a financial cloud with investigations by Parliament for the extravagances incurred in building Carlton House, London, the prince rented a modest, erstwhile farmhouse facing the Old Steine, a grassy area of Brighton used as a promenade by visitors. Remote from the royal court in London, the pavilion was a discreet location for the prince to enjoy private liaisons with his long-time companion, Maria Fitzherbert. The prince had wished to marry her, and did so in secrecy as her Roman Catholic religion prohibited his marrying her under the Royal Marriages Act 1772.

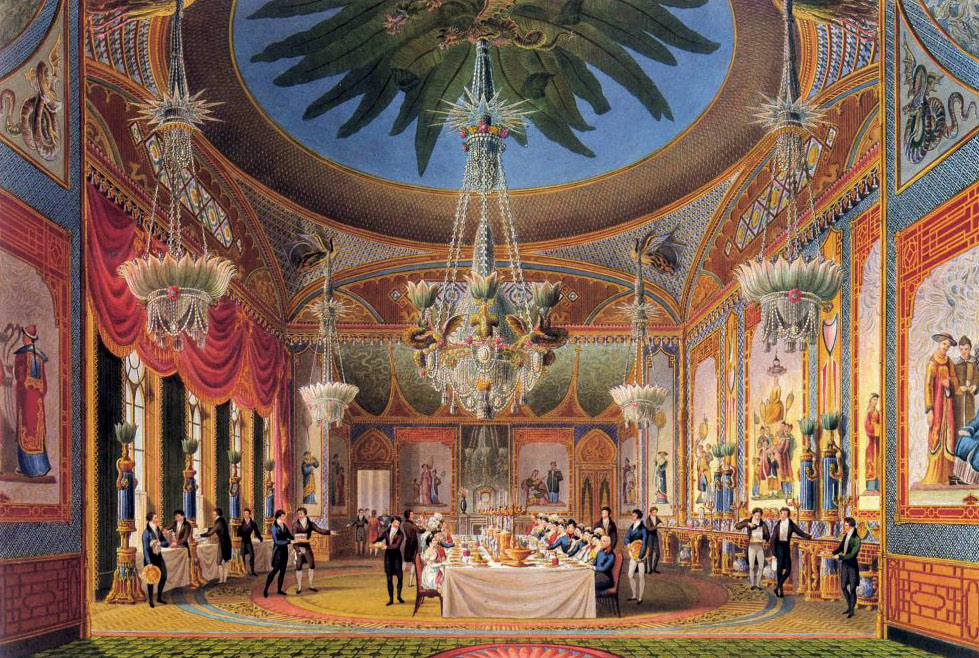
The richly decorated Banqueting Room at the Royal Pavilion, from John Nash's Views of the Royal Pavilion (1826)

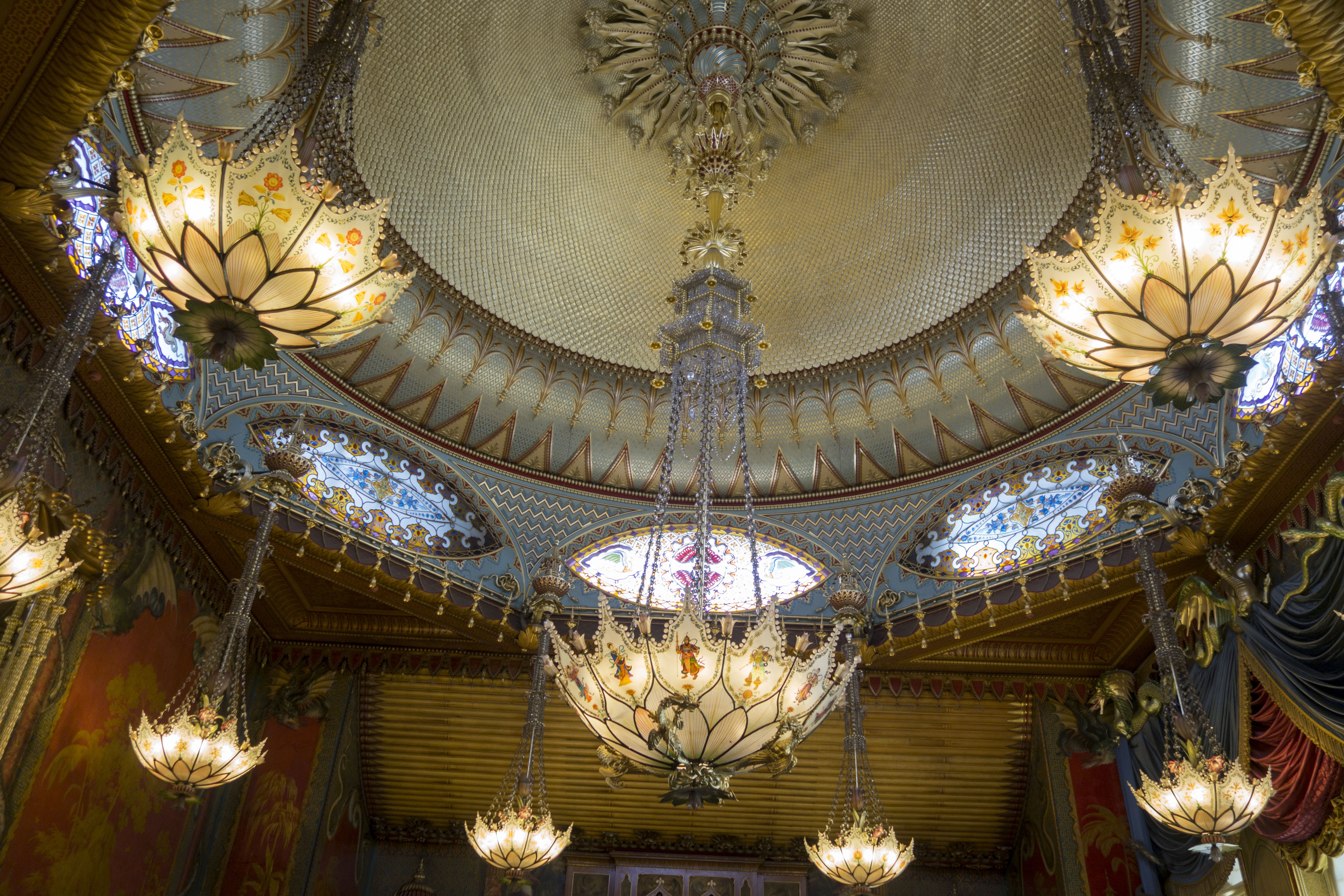
The ceiling of the Music Room at the Royal Pavilion

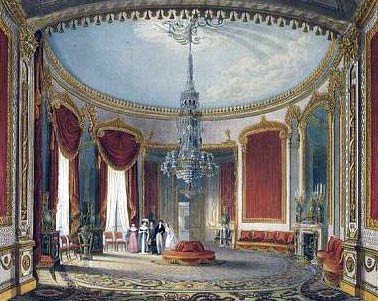
Grand Saloon at the Royal Pavilion in Brighton from John Nash's Views of the Royal Pavilion (1826)

In 1787, the prince commissioned the designer of Carlton House, Henry Holland, to enlarge the existing building. It became one wing of the Marine Pavilion, flanking a central rotunda, which contained three main rooms: a breakfast room, dining room, and library, fitted out in Holland's French-influenced neoclassical style, with decorative paintings by Biagio Rebecca. In 1801–02, the pavilion was enlarged with a new dining room and conservatory, to designs of Peter Frederick Robinson, who worked in Holland's office. The Prince also purchased land surrounding the property, on which a grand riding school and stables were built in an Indian style in 1803–08, to designs by William Porden. These provided stabling for 60 horses and dwarfed the Marine Pavilion.

Between 1815 and 1822, the designer John Nash redesigned and greatly extended the pavilion, and it is his work that is still visible today.

Nash brought to Brighton structural innovations pioneered in his earlier work on the Rotunda at Carlton House, particularly in the construction of the Music and Banqueting Rooms' distinctive tented roofs. These employed laminated timber construction techniques developed by Nash and his assistant William Nixon for the Carlton House Rotunda in 1814—a pioneering system using specialised iron connectors that allowed the roofs to span large ceremonial spaces without central supporting columns. Nixon, who had designed the Rotunda's innovative divided tie-beam truss system, continued working with Nash at Brighton Pavilion until his death in 1826. The palace is striking in the middle of Brighton, for its unique Indo-Islamic exterior. The fanciful interior design, primarily by Frederick Crace and the little-known decorative painter Robert Jones, was heavily influenced by both Chinese and Indian fashion (with Mughal and Islamic architectural elements). The architectural design of the Royal Pavilion has drawn comparisons to the Taj Mahal due to its prominent onion domes, minarets, and Indo-Saracenic influences. While the Taj Mahal is a Mughal mausoleum built in the 17th century, the Pavilion was designed in the early 19th century by John Nash as a seaside retreat for King George IV. Despite their different historical and cultural contexts, the Pavilion's exterior bears a visual resemblance to the iconic Indian monument, reflecting the 19th-century British fascination with South Asian architecture. It is a prime example of the exoticism that was an alternative to more classicising mainstream taste in the Regency style.

== Purchase by Brighton ==
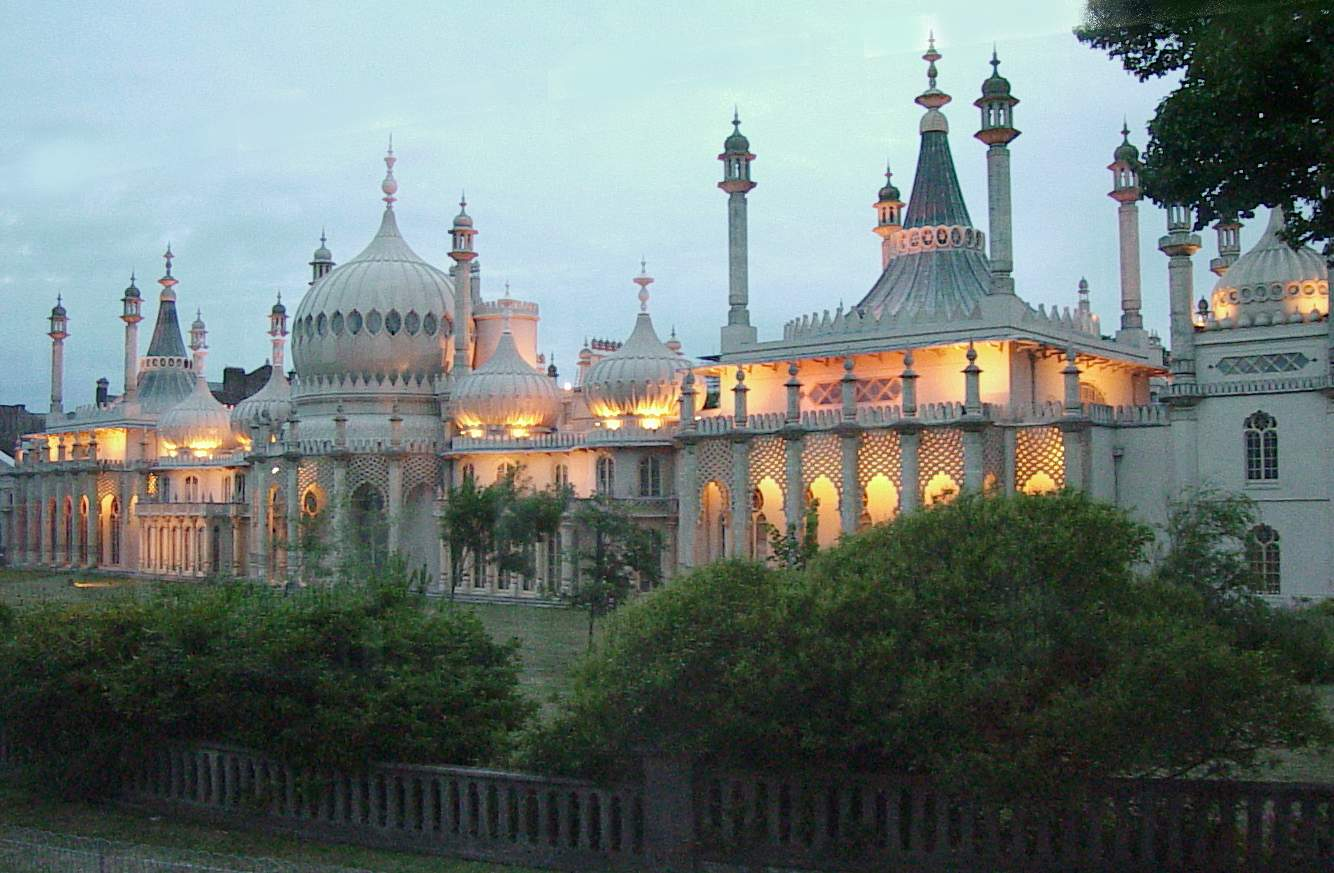
The Royal Pavilion at dusk

After the death of George IV in 1830, his successor William IV also stayed in the pavilion on his frequent visits to Brighton. Queen Victoria, however, disliked Brighton and the lack of privacy at the pavilion. Brighton became accessible to Londoners by rail in 1841, increasing its popularity with the masses. In addition, the pavilion was cramped for her growing family. Famously, Queen Victoria disliked the constant attention she attracted in Brighton, saying "the people here are very indiscreet and troublesome".

Brighton Royal Pavilion Act 1850
- Act of Parliament
- Parliament of the United Kingdom
- Long title: An Act to enable the Commissioners acting under an Act passed in the Sixth Year of the Reign of His late Majesty King George the Fourth, for better regulating, paving, improving, and managing the Town of Brighthelmston in the County of Sussex, and the Poor thereof, to purchase, improve, and manage the Royal Pavilion at Brighton, and the Grounds thereof, and to enlarge, extend, and apply the Powers and Provisions of the same Act with reference thereto.
- Citation: 13 & 14 Vict. c. v
- Territorial extent: United Kingdom

Dates
- Royal assent: 17 May 1850
- Commencement: 17 May 1850 (Note: The Acts of Parliament (Commencement) Act 1793.)
- Repealed: 1 April 1932
Other legislation
Repealed by	Brighton Corporation Act 1931

Status: Repealed

Text of statute as originally enacted

She purchased an estate and land that was redeveloped for Osborne House on the Isle of Wight, which became the summer home of the royal family. After her last visit to Brighton in 1845, the government planned to sell the building and grounds. The Brighton Improvement Commissioners and the Brighton Vestry successfully petitioned the government to sell the Pavilion to the town for £53,000 in 1850 under the Brighton Royal Pavilion Act 1850 (13 & 14 Vict. c. v). The sale helped fund furnishing of Osborne House.

In 1860, the adjacent royal stables were converted to a concert hall, now known as the Brighton Dome. The town used the building as assembly rooms. Many of the Pavilion's original fixtures and fittings were removed on the order of the royal household at the time of the sale, most ending up either in Buckingham Palace or Windsor Castle. In the late 1860s, Queen Victoria returned to Brighton large quantities of unused fittings. George V and Queen Mary returned more furnishings after the First World War.

Since the end of the Second World War, the municipality of Brighton has worked to restore the Pavilion to its state at the time of King George IV. The city was encouraged in the 1950s by the permanent loan of over 100 items of furniture from Queen Elizabeth II. It has undertaken an extensive programme of restoring the rooms, reinstating stud walls, and creating replicas of some original fittings and occasionally pieces of furniture.

In 2020, management and operation of the Royal Pavilion & Museums' buildings and collections were transferred from Brighton & Hove City Council to a new charity: the Royal Pavilion & Museums Trust.

== First World War ==
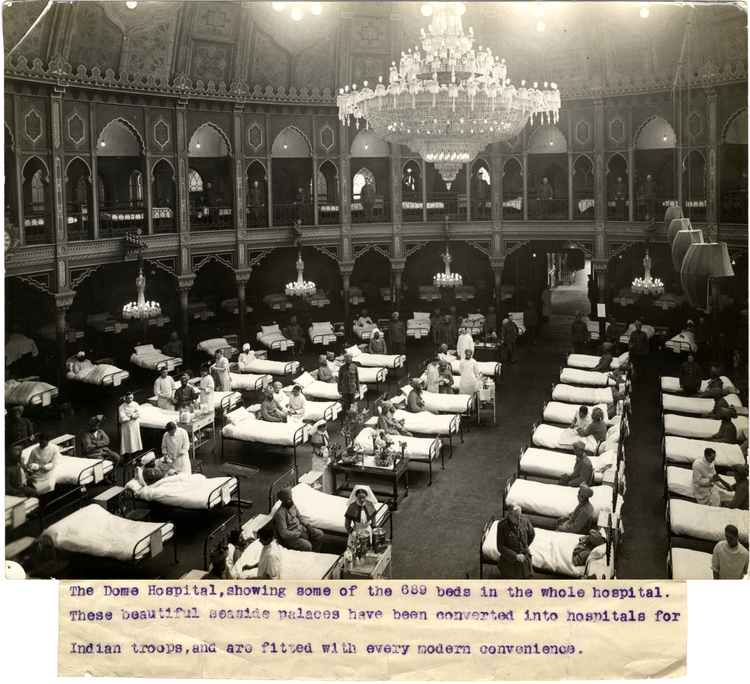
Hospital beds at the Dome during the First World War

During the First World War, the Pavilion, along with other sites in Brighton, was transformed into a military hospital. From December 1914 to January 1916, sick and wounded soldiers from the Indian Army were treated in the former palace. Many Indian recipients of the Victoria Cross were treated here such as Khudadad Khan, Darwan Singh Negi, Shahamad Khan and Mir Dast. The Pavilion hospital also incorporated the adjacent Dome and Corn Exchange; these buildings had formerly been part of the large stable complex associated with the residence.

The Pavilion hospital was set up with two operating theatres and over 720 beds. Over 2,300 men from the Indian Army were treated at the hospital. Elaborate arrangements were made to cater for the patients' variety of religious and cultural needs. Nine different kitchens were set up in the grounds of the hospital, so that food could be cooked by the soldiers' fellow caste members and co-religionists. Muslim soldiers were given space on the eastern lawns to pray facing towards Mecca, while Sikh soldiers were provided with a tented gurdwara in the grounds.

The imperial government highlighted the Pavilion as showing that wounded countrymen of British India were being well treated. With the official sanction of the state, a series of photographs were made to show the resplendent rooms converted into hospital wards. The soldiers were visited by Lord Kitchener in July 1915, and King George V in August of the same year, who presented several soldiers such as Mir Dast with military honours.

The military hospital for Indian soldiers closed at the end of January 1916 after most of the British Indian Army had been withdrawn from the Western Front in France and redeployed to the Middle East.

The Pavilion reopened as a hospital in April 1916. It became a hospital for 'limbless men,' treating British soldiers who had lost arms and legs, usually from amputation. In addition to treating the men's physical needs, a great emphasis was placed on rehabilitating the men by training them in skills and trades. The Pavilion hospital operated until the summer of 1920, when the building was returned to Brighton Corporation.

A new gateway in Indian style was unveiled in 1921 by Bhupinder Singh, the Maharaja of Patiala to commemorate the Pavilion's role in treating injured Indian soldiers during the war.

== Tourism ==
The purchase of the Royal Pavilion from Queen Victoria, by Brighton, marked the beginnings of the site's attraction as a tourist destination. The Royal Pavilion has been changed from a private residence to a public attraction under civic ownership. Today, around 200,000 people visit the Royal Pavilion annually. General filming and photography are permitted inside the Royal Pavilion. Many of the items in the palace are on loan, in particular from HM The King.

== Marriage venue ==
The Royal Pavilion is licensed as a venue for weddings. On 29 March 2014, the Royal Pavilion was host to one of a number of the first legal same-sex marriages to take place in the United Kingdom following the passage of the 2013 Same Sex Couples Act.

== Royal Pavilion Garden ==
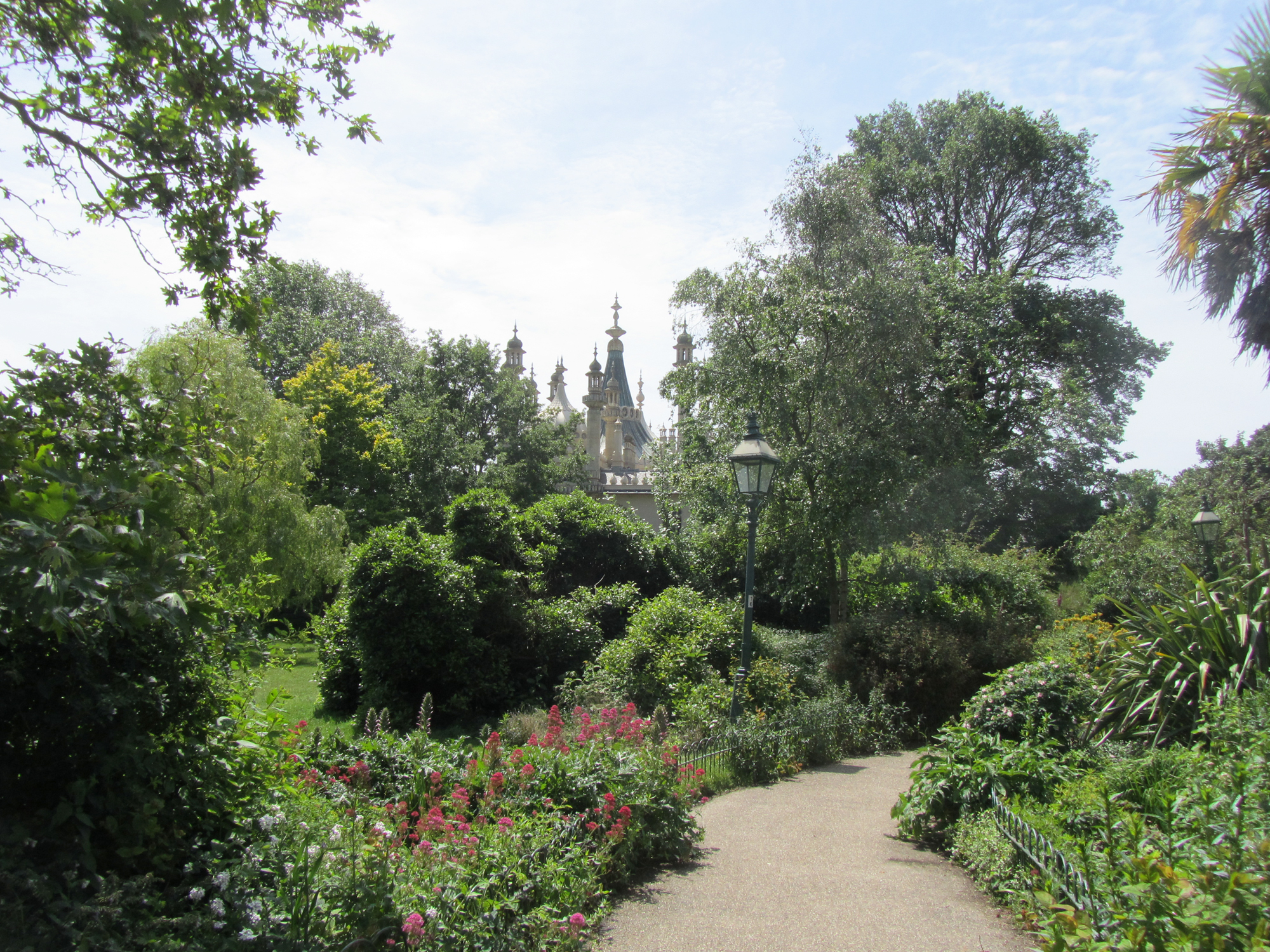
Pavilion Gardens walkway

The Royal Pavilion Garden, in the Pavilion's grounds, has a wide variety of plants, having been restored to Nash's original Regency vision. It is said to be the only fully restored Regency garden in the UK. The garden is maintained using only organic methods by the Trust's garden team led by a Head gardener and including volunteers.

The garden is often used by street entertainers, especially in summer. It also contains a café.

The garden is Grade II listed in the Register of Historic Parks and Gardens. Historic England deemed the garden 'at risk' in October 2017 due to its original character being blighted and overshadowed by unsightly fencing, litter bins, signage and lighting etc. Brighton and Hove City Council opened a public consultation on the future of the gardens after they were put on Historic England's "At Risk" register. A list of over 20,000 crimes and anti-social behaviour incidents (including indecent sexual behaviour and drug abuse) that had taken place at the gardens had been reported to the city council in 2017, raising the possibility of fencing off the gardens and closing them at night.

The gardens have ornamental gates at the north and south entrances. Just outside the north gate is the statue of George IV.

== Image gallery ==
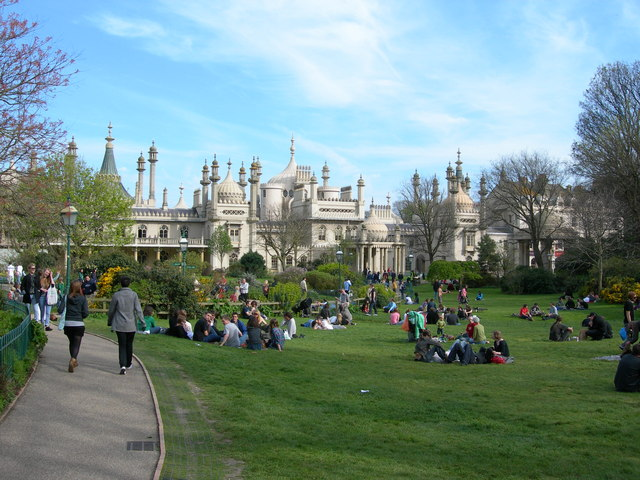
Pavilion Gardens with Pavilion in the background

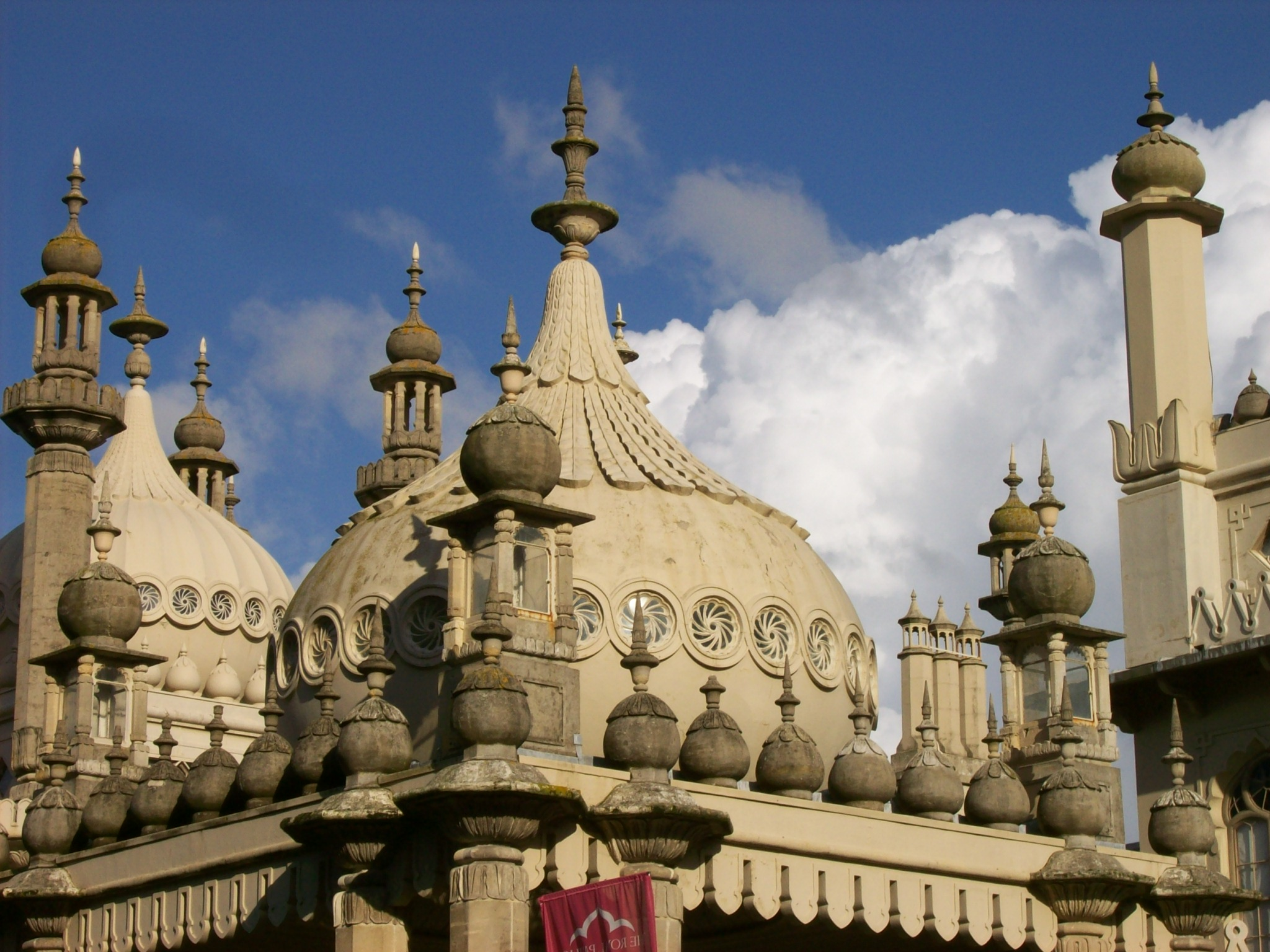
Domes

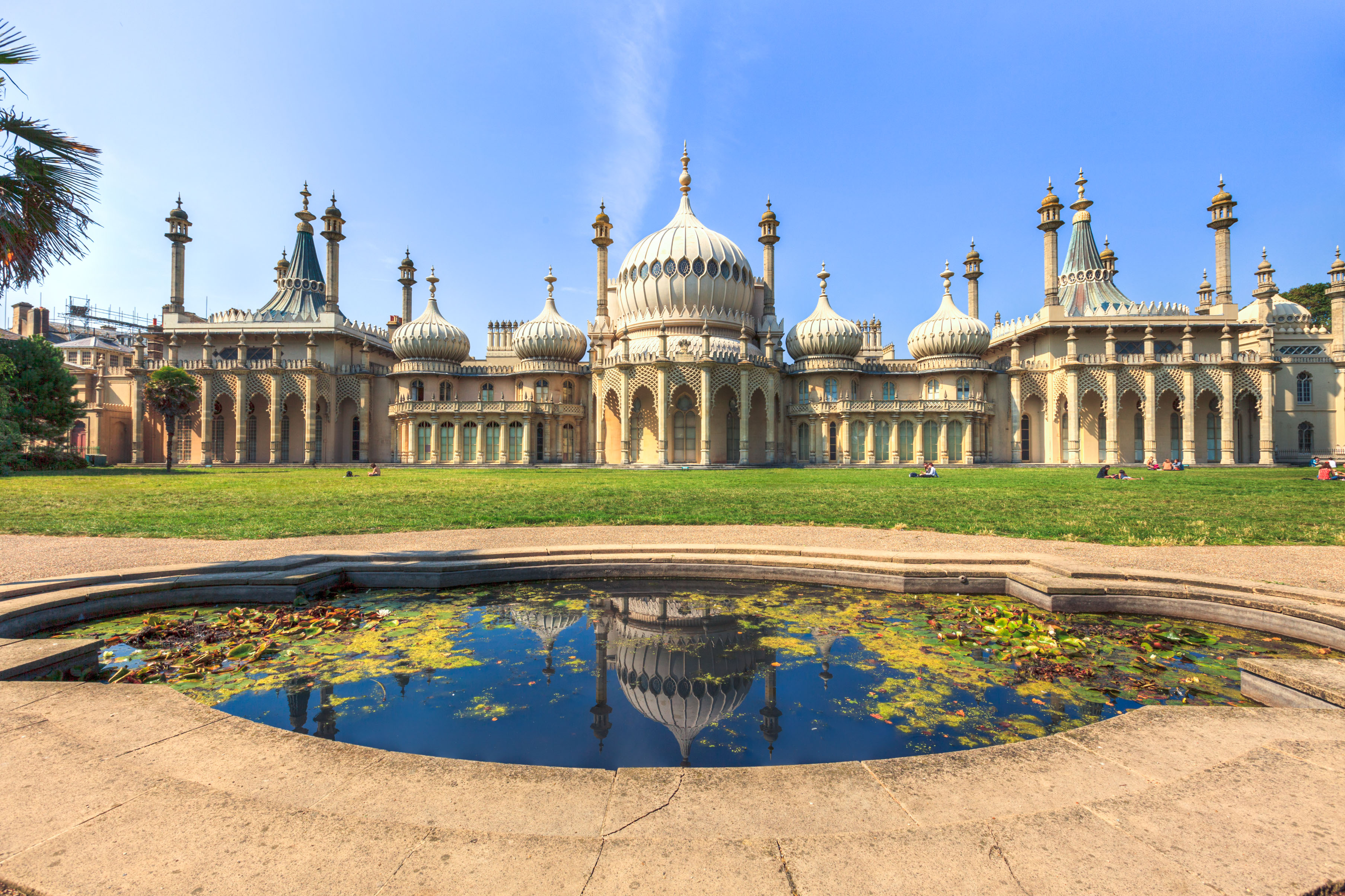
Royal Pavilion Brighton and reflective pool

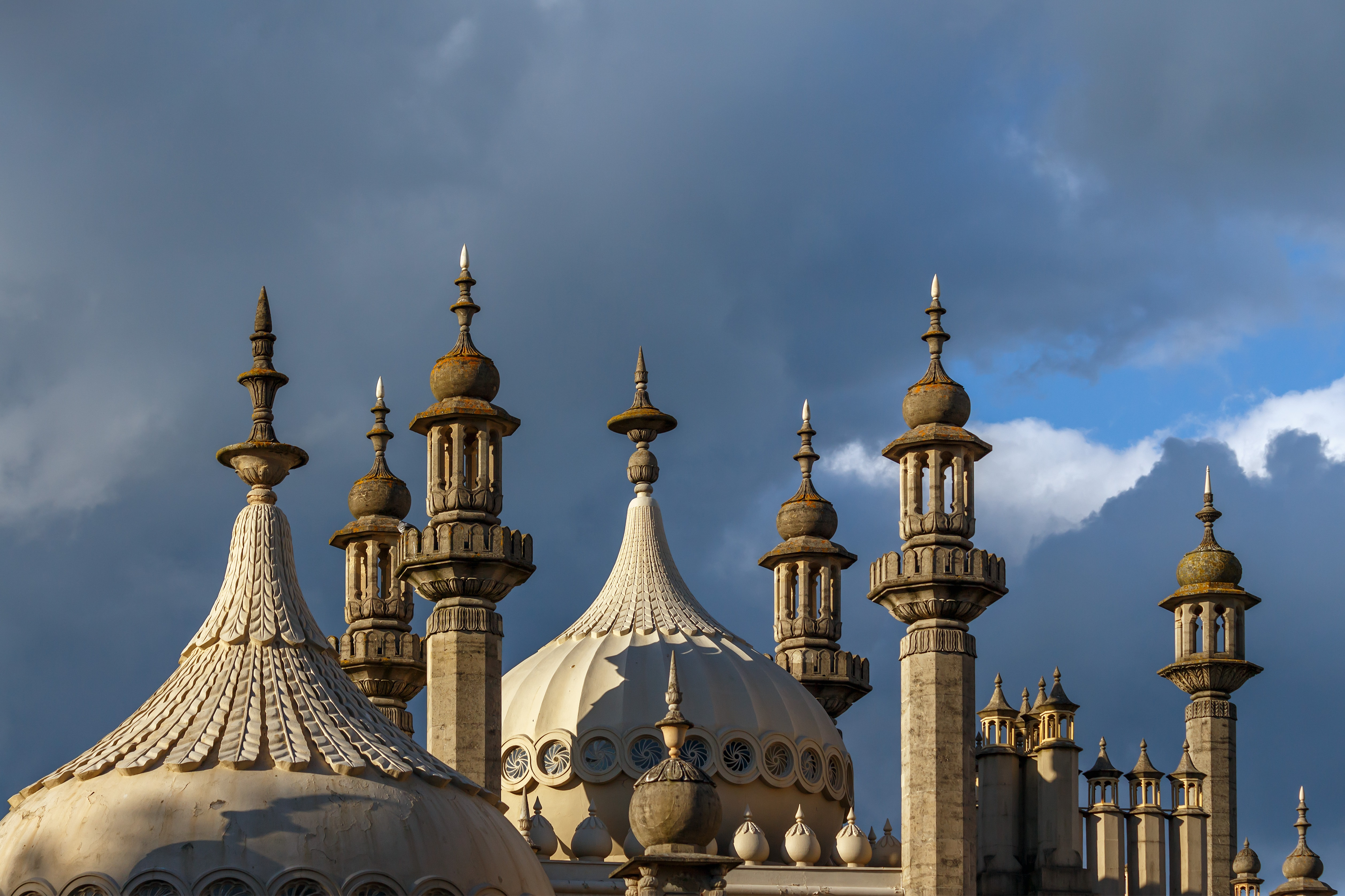
Rooftop

== See also ==
- Grade I listed buildings in Brighton and Hove
