= Newbury Abbot Trent =

British sculptor (1885–1953)

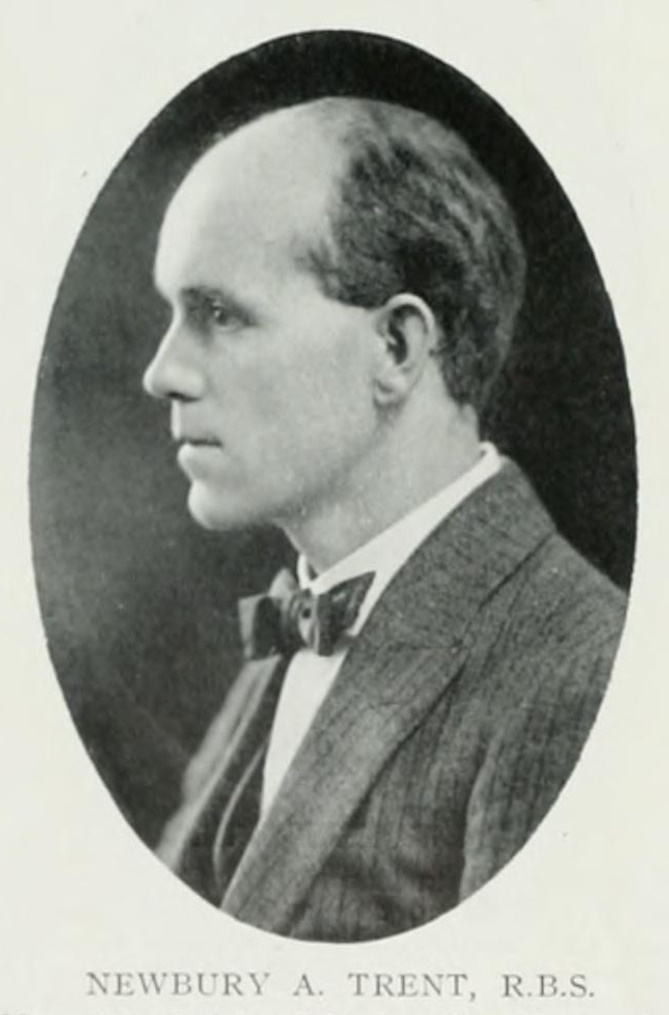
- Newbury Abbot Trent, photographed in 1921.
- Born: 14 October 1885; Forest Gate, Essex
- Died: 2 August 1953 (aged 67); London, England
- Education: Royal College of Art and the Royal Academy Schools
- Known for: Sculpture

Newbury Abbot Trent (14 October 1885 – 2 August 1953) was an English sculptor and medallist. Trent studied at the Royal College of Art and Royal Academy Schools, where he became an associate. His works include reliefs, statues and other forms of sculpture. Many of his most notable works are war memorials in England, Scotland and Wales.

== Background ==
Newbury Abbot Trent was born in Forest Gate in Essex on 14 October 1885. He was one of eleven children of Walter F. Trent who was a builder and ship fitter by trade. His relative was the cinema architect William Edward Trent. (Note: Some source say Newbury Abbott Trent was his younger brother; others say his cousin.)

When Newbury was about eleven years old, the painter and arts administrator Thomas Armstrong recognised his artistic talent when he discovered the boy drawing at the South Kensington Museum. Armstrong, whose own son had died at about the same age, persuaded Newbury's parents to allow him to adopt the boy and bring him up as an artist. Trent received early tuition at an art school at West Ham. In 1894 he gained an art scholarship to the Royal College of Art, where he studied for five years. In 1900 Trent entered the Royal Academy Schools.

In 1902 Trent was awarded a commission in open competition for a memorial to King Edward VII at Brighton and Hove. Other major commissions during his career included the recumbent effigy of Dean Pigou in Bristol Cathedral and war memorials at New Barnet, Beckenham, Wanstead, Ilford, Tredegar and Wallsend.

Trent married (Phyllis) Hilda Ledward who was the daughter of the sculptor Richard Arthur Ledward (1857–90) and sister to Gilbert Ledward (1888–1960). They had two daughters: Margaret (Peggy) and Jennifer 1917–2002, who both trained as architects.

Trent became an Associate of the Royal Academy and worked throughout his life from a studio on Beaufort Street, Chelsea, London.

Trent made many friezes and bas relief panels for various cinemas in the Gaumont group. His relative William Edward Trent was the chief architect for Gaumont. At least seven Gaumont cinemas designed featured sculptural works by Trent (New Victoria Cinema, Westminster, London (now the Apollo Victoria Theatre) 1930; Gaumont Palace, Hammersmith (now the Hammersmith Apollo), 1932; Gaumont Palace Theatre, Taunton (now Mecca Bingo) 1932; Gaumont Palace, Cheltenham, 1934, now demolished; Gaumont Palace, King's Road, Chelsea, London (now the Curzon Chelsea Cinema) 1934; Gaumont Palace, Doncaster 1934, now demolished; and Gaumont Theatre, North Finchley, London, 1937, now demolished.

Newbury Abbot Trent died on 2 August 1953. His cremation took place at Putney Vale Crematorium.

== Works ==
=== List of works ===
The following is a partial list of Trent's work, other than war memorials. (See W. E. Trent for a partial list of the cinemas for which Newbury Abbot Trent provided sculptures, friezes and plaques.)

| Work | Location | Type | Notes and References |
|---|---|---|---|
| 3 St James' Square Reliefs | Westminster London | Relief | Trent created several stone relief panels depicting London street scenes- A knife grinder, a woman selling lavender, some people buying fruit from a street vendor and a town crier. See photographs in gallery below. |
| A Sower | Unknown | Unknown | This work was exhibited at the 1918 Seventy third Annual Exhibition of the Royal West of England Academy. |
| Adelphi Building | The Strand London | Sculpture | This building in John Adam Street just off The Strand has external sculptures by Bainbridge Copnall, Arthur J Ayres, Gilbert Ledward and Donald Gilbert. The building also has carved reliefs next to the entrance doors, created by Newbury Abbot Trent in 1938, depicting industrial scenes. The west side relief is titled 'Recreation on the River', the east side relief 'Labour on the River'. |
| Boy with fruit | Unknown | Unknown | This work was exhibited at the 1920 Seventy Fifth Annual Exhibition of the Royal West of England Academy. |
| Bristol Cathedral | Bristol | Sculpture | Trent executed an effigy to Dean Francis Pigou which is located in the nave of Bristol Cathedral. |
| Bronze paper weight | Unknown | Sculpture | This paper weight was exhibited at the 11th Arts & Crafts Society Exhibition in 1916. |
| Colt | Unknown | Wood carving | Wood Carving exhibited in 1943 in The Royal Glasgow Institute of Fine Art. Second Annual Exhibition. |
| Dans le Rêve | Unknown | Sculpture | This work was exhibited at the 1924 Seventy Ninth Annual Exhibitions of the Royal West of England Academy. |
| David, Son of Michael Waterhouse, Esq. | Unknown | Sculpture | This work was exhibited at the 1929 Eighty-Fourth Annual Exhibitions of the Royal West of England Academy. |
| Eve | Unknown | Sculpture | The statuette was exhibited in 1943 in The Royal Glasgow Institute of Fine Art. Second Annual Exhibition. |
| Eros | Unknown | Sculpture | Bronze sculpture was exhibited in 1943 in The Royal Glasgow Institute of Fine Art. Second Annual Exhibition. |
| Flight Sub-Lieut Leslie E. Adlam, RN | Unknown | Unknown | This work was exhibited at the 1918 Seventy third Annual Exhibition of the Royal West of England Academy. |
| Gaumont Cinema | North Finchley | Sculpture | Trent created figures for the cinema, which was demolished several years ago and it is not known whether his was saved. He also created 15 Figures for the exterior the old Odeon Cinema in Cheltenham. See image below. |
| Gaumont Cinema | King's Road Chelsea London | Panels | For the Gaumont Cinema on the King's Road in Chelsea Trent produced two Art Deco style panels which depict "The Awakening of Science to the Force of the Elements" and "The Harvesting of the Elements in the Film". Also on the facade of the building there is a bas-relief head of William Friese-Greene with masks of comedy and tragedy on either side. See Images in gallery below. |
| Gaumont Palace cinema, now the Hammersmith Apollo | Hammersmith London | Murals | Trent carried out some murals for this cinema/theatre. |
| Gaumont Palace Theatre (now Mecca Bingo) | Corporation Street Taunton | Relief | This work, depicting a mermaid and accompanying child, sits above the entrance to the (now) bingo hall. Originally opened as the Gaumont Palace Theatre on 11 July 1932, it become the Gaumont Cinema, then an Odeon, then a Top Rank Bingo Club and is now a Mecca Bingo Hall. |
| Gerald du Maurier Esq | Unknown | Unknown | This work was exhibited at the 1917 Seventy Second Annual Exhibition of the Royal West of England Academy. |
| Hugh Craig | Unknown | Unknown | This work was exhibited at the 1918 Seventy third Annual Exhibition of the Royal West of England Academy. |
| Jackie | Unknown | Sculpture | This work was exhibited at the 1924 Seventy Ninth Annual Exhibitions of the Royal West of England Academy. |
| Jennifer | Unknown | Sculpture | This work was exhibited at The Seventy Seventh and Seventy Eighth Annual Exhibitions of the Royal West of England Academy. |
| Joan, daughter of Miss Gladys Cooper (Mrs Buckmaster) | Unknown | Unknown | This work was exhibited at the 1918 Seventy third Annual Exhibition of the Royal West of England Academy. |
| Lieut-Col Guy du Maurier, DSO | Unknown | Unknown | This work was exhibited at the 1917 Seventy Second Annual Exhibition of the Royal West of England Academy. |
| "Margaret" | Unknown | Unknown | This work was exhibited at the 1917 Seventy Second Annual Exhibition of the Royal West of England Academy. |
| Mdlle Pavlova in the Swan Dance | Unknown | Unknown | This work was exhibited at the 1917 Seventy Second Annual Exhibition of the Royal West of England Academy. |
| Meditation | Unknown | Unknown | This work was exhibited at the 1919 Seventy Fourth Annual Exhibition of the Royal West of England Academy. |
| Mermaid | Unknown | Sculpture | The bronze statuette was exhibited at The Royal Glasgow Institute of the Fine Arts Eighty-Second Annual Exhibition, 1943. |
| Morning | Unknown | Unknown | This work was exhibited at the 1918 Seventy third Annual Exhibition of the Royal West of England Academy. |
| New Victoria Cinema, Westminster, London (now the Apollo Victoria Theatre) | Westminster, London | Relief panels | Trent executed relief panels for this London cinema. See Images below. |
| Night | Unknown | Unknown | This work was exhibited at the 1920 Seventy Fifth Annual Exhibition of the Royal West of England Academy. |
| One of the Nausicäas Maidens | Unknown | Unknown | This work was exhibited at the 1918 Seventy third Annual Exhibition of the Royal West of England Academy. |
| Paper weight | Unknown | Sculpture | This work was exhibited at the 1917 Seventy Second Annual Exhibition of the Royal West of England Academy. |
| "The Peace Statue" | Brighton Sussex | Sculpture | Trent created the bronze angel known as the "Peace Statue" as a monument to Edward VII. This monument, built by William Kirkpatrick Limited and the founders A.B. Burton of Thames Ditton, was unveiled on 12 October 1912 by the Duke of Norfolk, Lord Lieutenant of Sussex. It is located on the boundary between Brighton and Hove in Sussex. |
| "Peace" Statue | Bath Somerset | Sculpture | The statue is very similar to the work in Brighton. |
| Peggy | Unknown | Unknown | This work was exhibited at the 1917 Seventy Second Annual Exhibition of the Royal West of England Academy. |
| Peter Pan | Unknown | Sculpture | This work was exhibited at the 1923 Seventy Eighth Annual Exhibitions of the Royal West of England Academy. |
| Stanley Baldwin, Esq., MP | Unknown | Sculpture | This work was exhibited at 1929 Eighty-Fourth Annual Exhibitions of the Royal West of England Academy. |
| Thalía | Unknown | Sculpture | This work was exhibited at the 1927 Eighty-Second Annual Exhibitions of the Royal West of England Academy. |
| The Cloud | Unknown | Sculpture | This work was exhibited at the 1929 Eighty-Fourth Annual Exhibitions of the Royal West of England Academy. |
| The Temptation | Unknown | Sculpture | This work was exhibited at the 1926 Eighty-First Annual Exhibitions of the Royal West of England Academy. The statue was shown on BBC Antiques Roadshow broadcast on 14 July 2013. Inherited by great niece of sculptor. |
| The Water Carrier | Unknown | Sculpture | This bronze sculpture was exhibited at the 11th Arts & Crafts Society Exhibition in 1916. |
| The Young Bather | Unknown | Sculpture | This work was exhibited at the 1923 Seventy Eighth Annual Exhibitions of the Royal West of England Academy. |
| Thirteen | Unknown | Unknown | This work was exhibited at the 1920 Seventy Fifth Annual Exhibition of the Royal West of England Academy. |

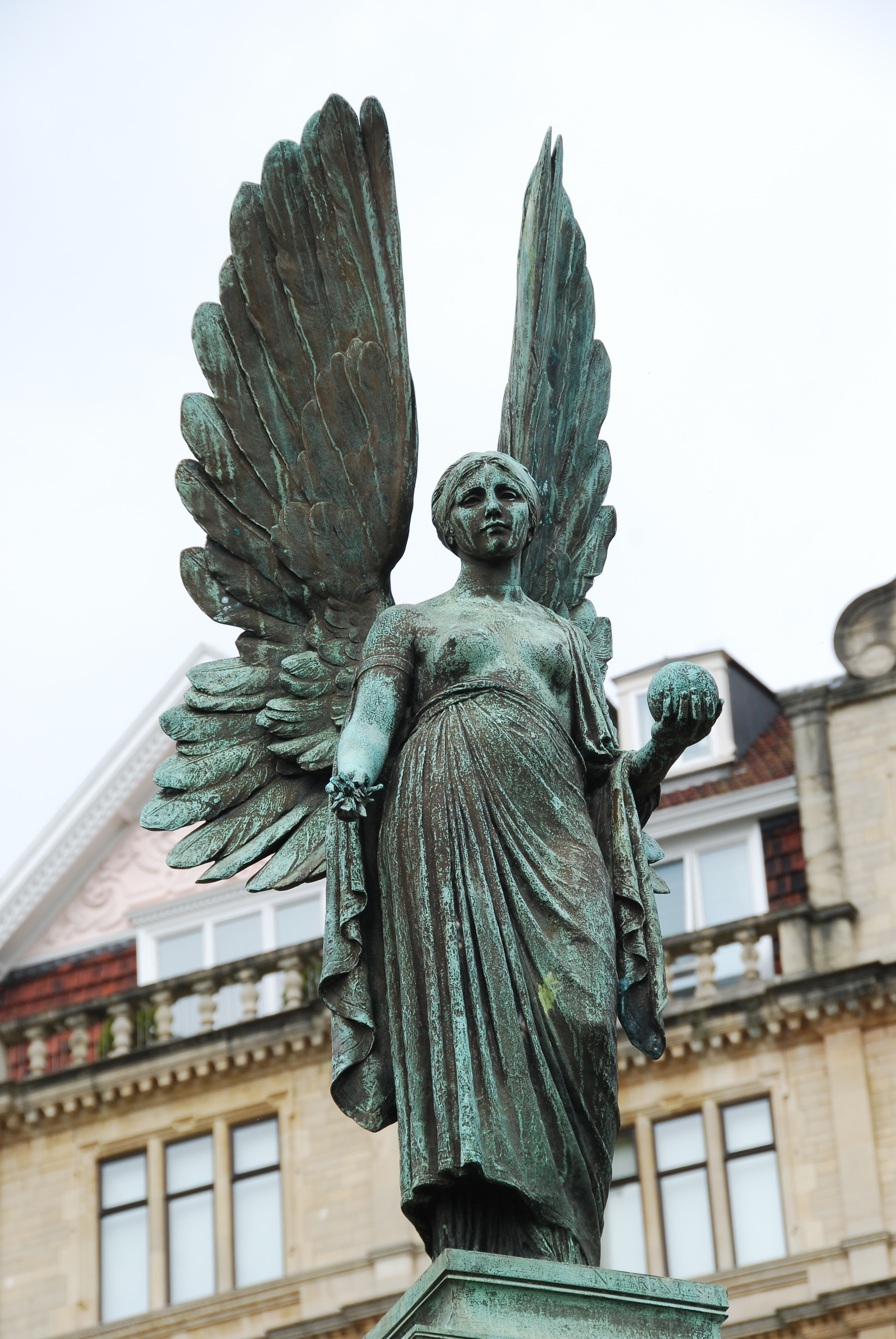
"Angel of Peace" in Bath. Photograph shown courtesy Jim Ebdon.

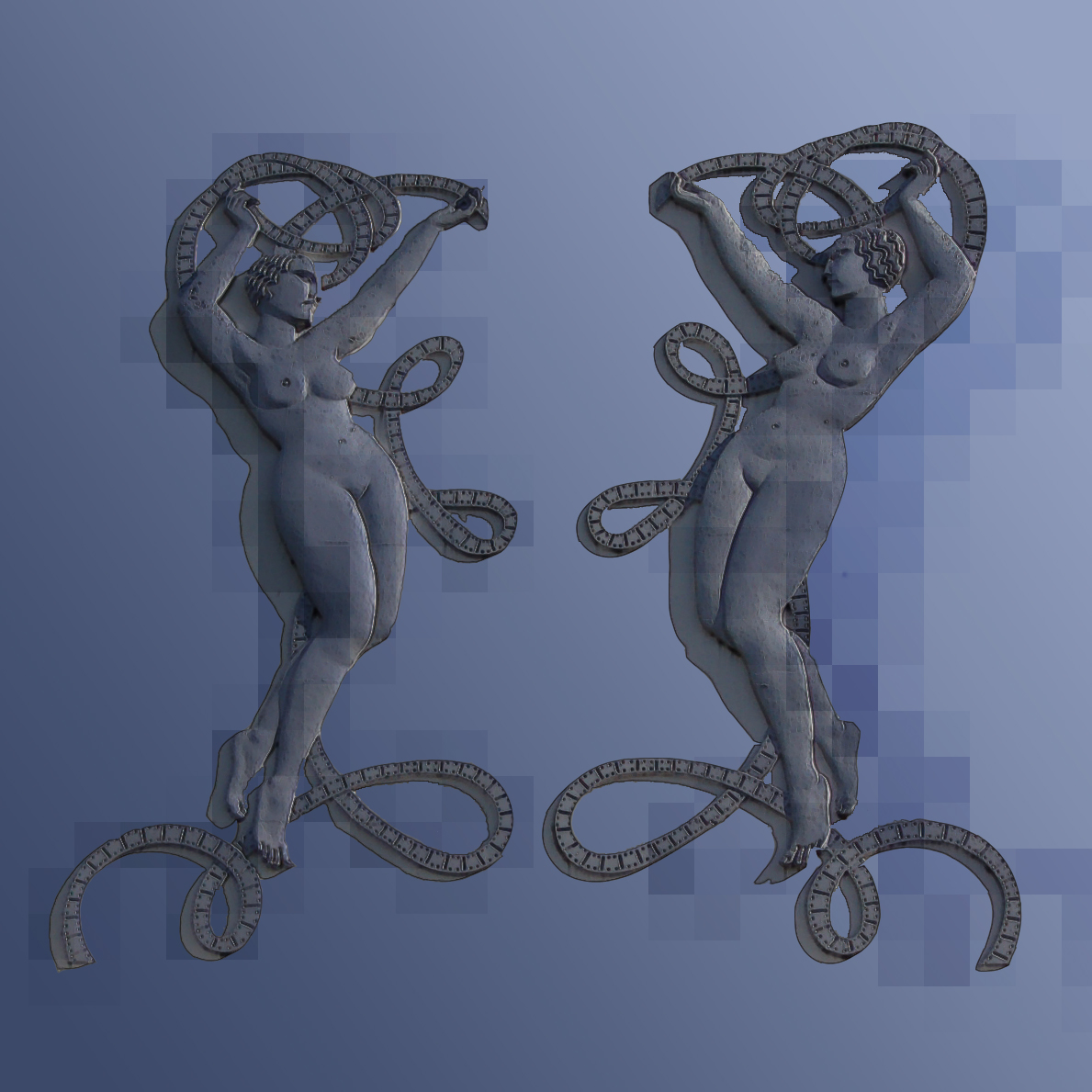
Relief on Cheltenham Cinema. Courtesy Tim Chance.

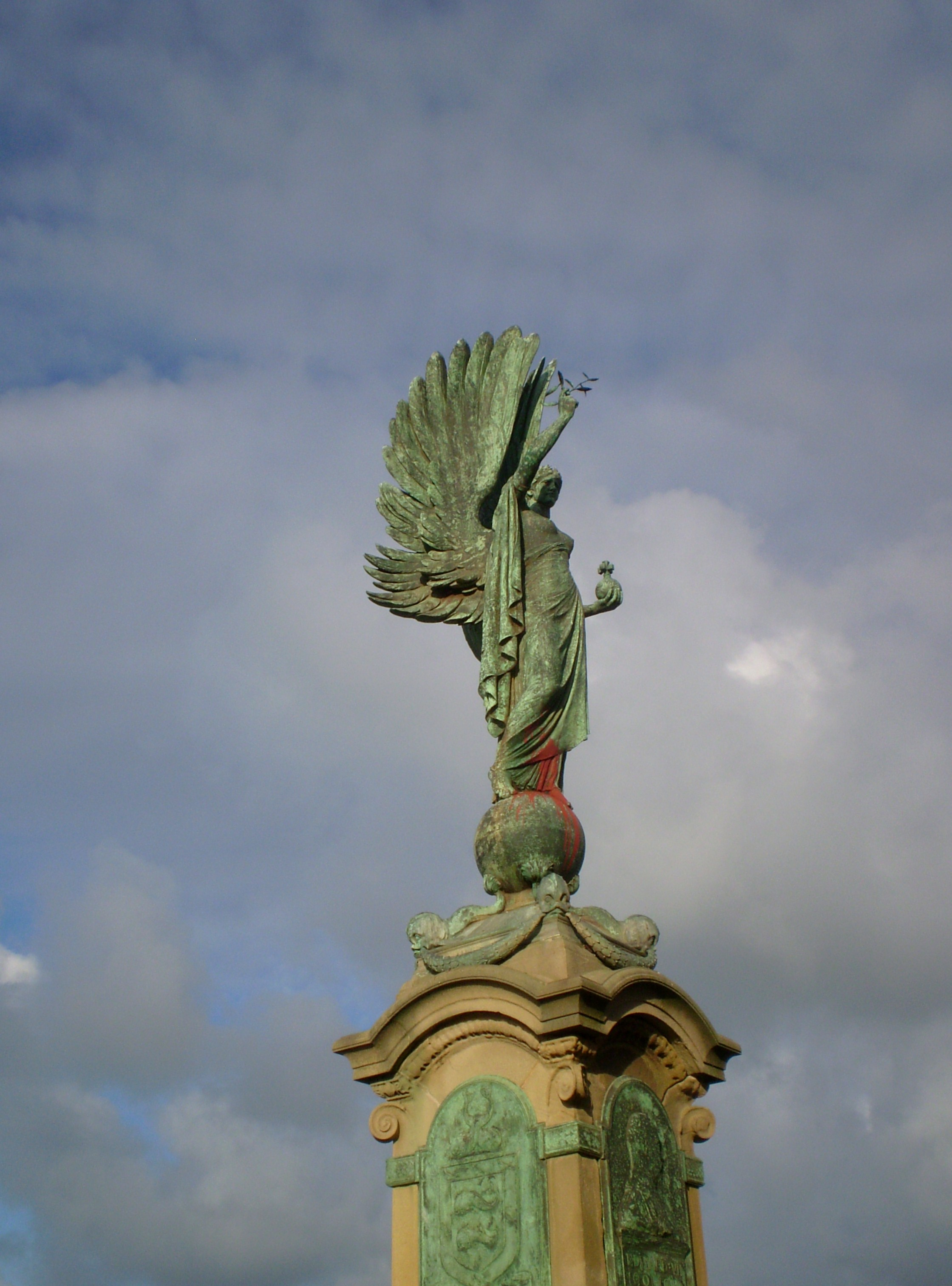
Edward VII statue in Hove/Brighton.

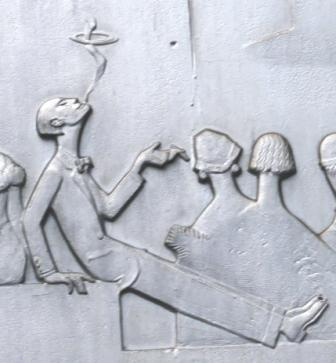
Close-up of one of the relief panels-Apollo Victoria.

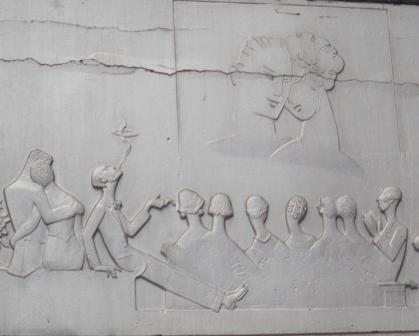
Apollo Victoria relief panel

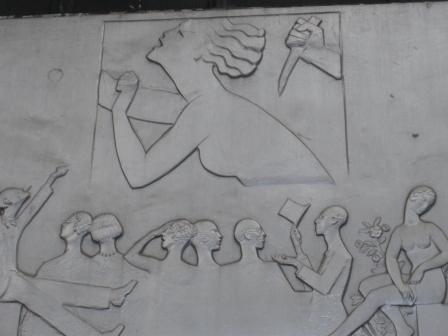
Apollo Victoria relief panel

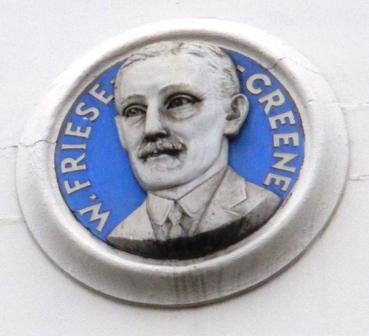
Friese Greene. Gaumont Cinema. King's Road. Chelsea.

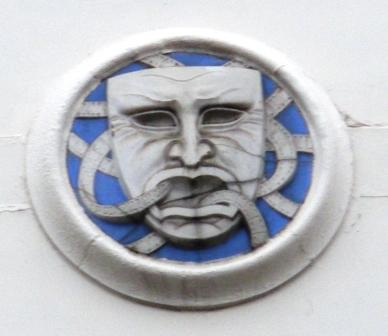
The mask of Tragedy.Gaumont Cinema. King's Road. Chelsea.

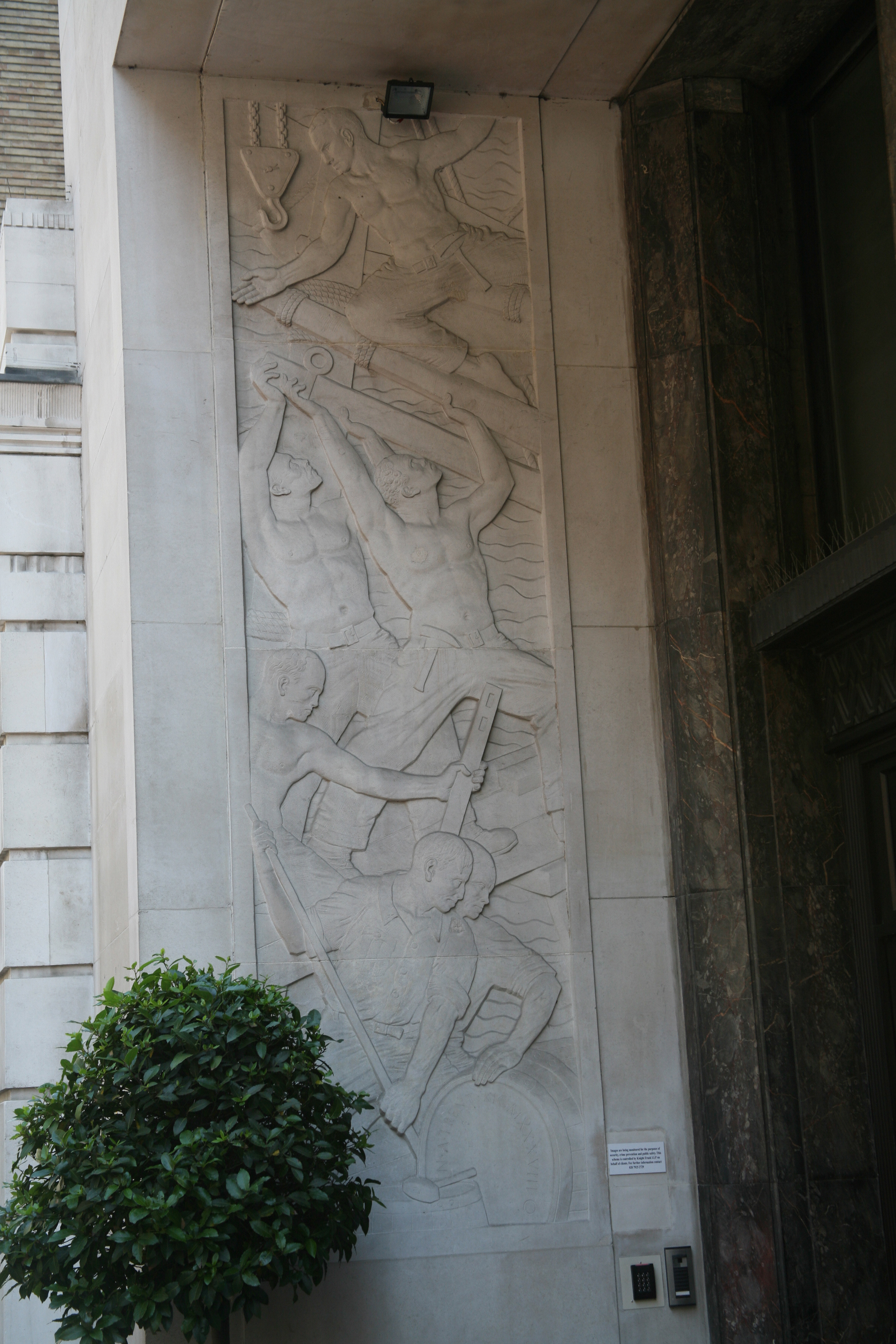
One of two reliefs on the side walls of Adelphi entrance by Newbury Abbot Trent. This relief is titled: Labour on the River. Photograph shown courtesy John Linwood.

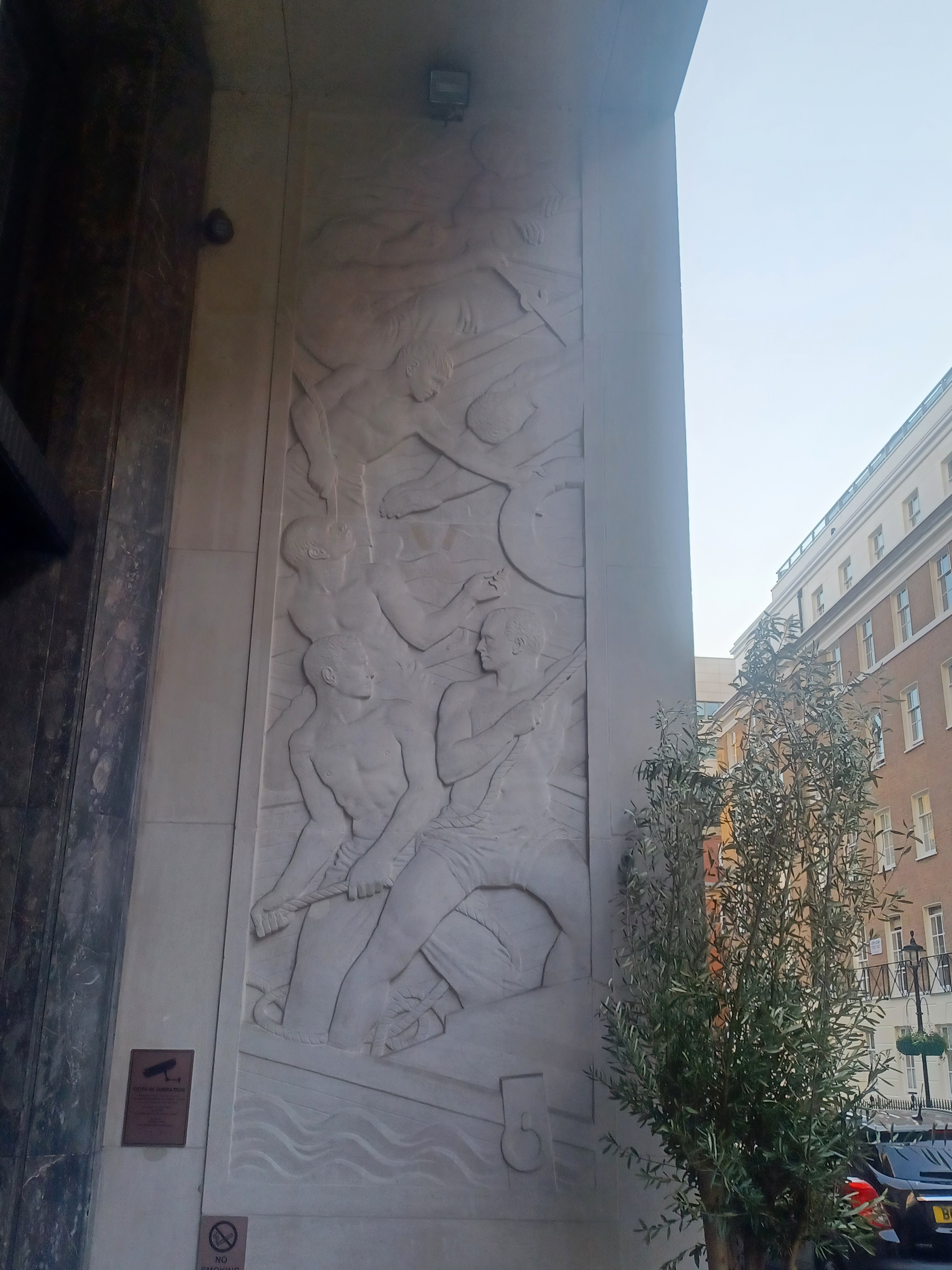
The west side relief by Newbury Abbot Trent next to the Adelphi building entrance. Titled: Recreation on the River.

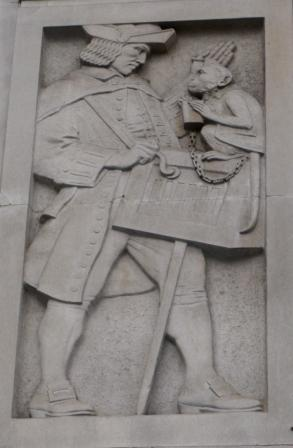
Buchanon House Relief

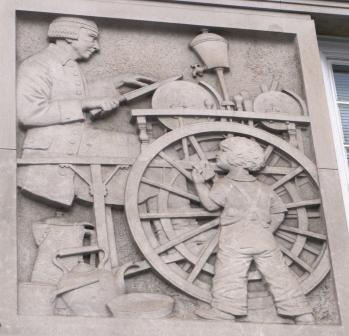
Knife grinder at work

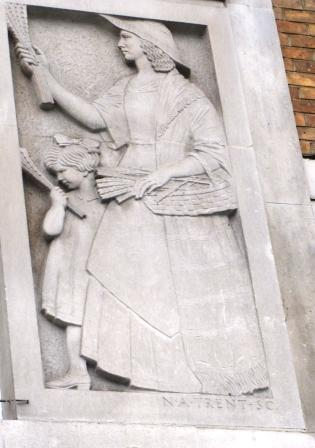
A woman sells lavender accompanied by child.

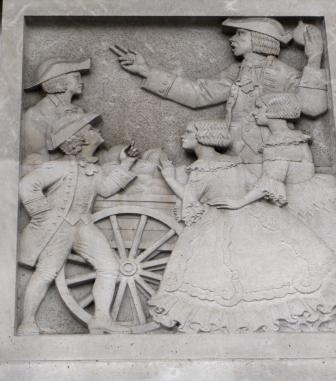
People buying fruit from barrow

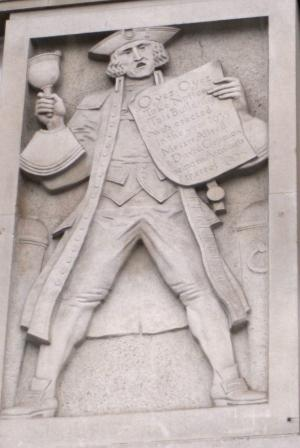
Town Crier

=== War memorials ===
| Work | Location | Notes and References |
|---|---|---|
| Beckenham War Memorial | Beckenham Kent | Trent designed the Beckenham War Memorial. The column made of Portland Stones is 7.5 metres high is located in the High Street of Beckenham in Kent and memorializes the 707 men who were killed in the 1914–1918 conflict and the 300 men of Beckenham who died in the 1939–1945 war, as well as 330 civilians who died in the same war. One relief features St George slaying the dragon and the other shows a phoenix rising from the ashes. The memorial was unveiled on 24 July 1921 by Sergeant B. Hanscombe. |
| Ilford War Memorial | Ilford Essex | For the Ilford War Memorial in Ilford War Memorial Gardens in Essex, Trent sculpted a soldier in full kit and shown presenting arms. A Celtic Cross rises above the soldier. HRH Princess Louise Duchess of Argyll and Lt. General Sir Francis Lloyd unveiled the monument on 11 November 1922. |
| New Barnet War Memorial | New Barnet London | War memorial on Station Road in New Barnet, London features sculptural work by Trent. The memorial features a 109-foot high bronze figure representing "Victory" and a carving in stone over the western panel shows the victory of the "British Lion" over the "German Eagle". This memorial remembers the 278 men of New Barnet who gave their lives in the Great War. The memorial was unveiled on 20 March 1921 by Viscount Hampden. See photographs in gallery below. |
| St Baldreds Church | Lothian, Scotland | The War Memorial in St Baldreds Church in North Berwick, Lothian has sculptural work by Trent. It commemorates Aubrey Blackwood Porter, a Lieutenant in the Highland Light Infantry who was killed in action in France in 1915. The monument includes a metal plaque mounted on marble with a relief portrait at the top and the Highland Light Infantry badge at the bottom. |
| Tredegar War Memorial | Tredegar | The Tredegar War Memorial in Bedwellty Park, Tredegar, Wales features a soldier holding rifle in "present arms" position. It was unveiled by Lord Tredegar on 14 December 1924. A casket containing a roll of honour of those who died has been placed in Bedwellty House. See images of some of these war memorials below. |
| Wallsend War Memorial | Wallsend | Memorial stands at Holy Cross overlooking Burn Closes in Wallsend in the Tyne and Wear area. A bronze "Victory" figure is at the top of a tapering obelisk. The memorial was unveiled by a Mr. Summers Hunter on 11 November 1925. |
| Wanstead War Memorial | Wanstead | The Wanstead War Memorial in Wanstead High Street features a bronze winged "Victory" figure, half draped carrying four palm leaves and wearing a laurel wreath on her head. The memorial remembers the men of Wanstead who fought during the First World War. It was also extended after World War II to commemorate the men and women who lost their lives during the war. |

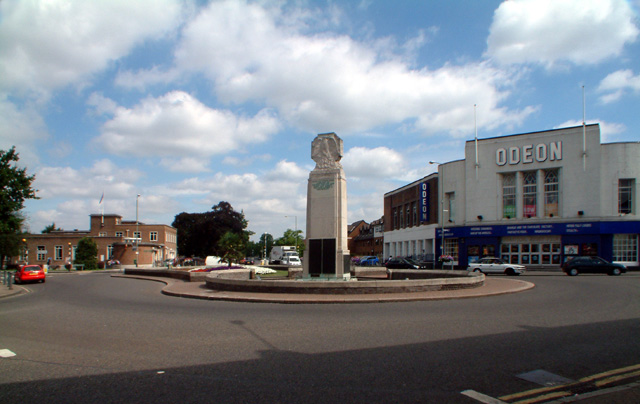
Beckenham War Memorial

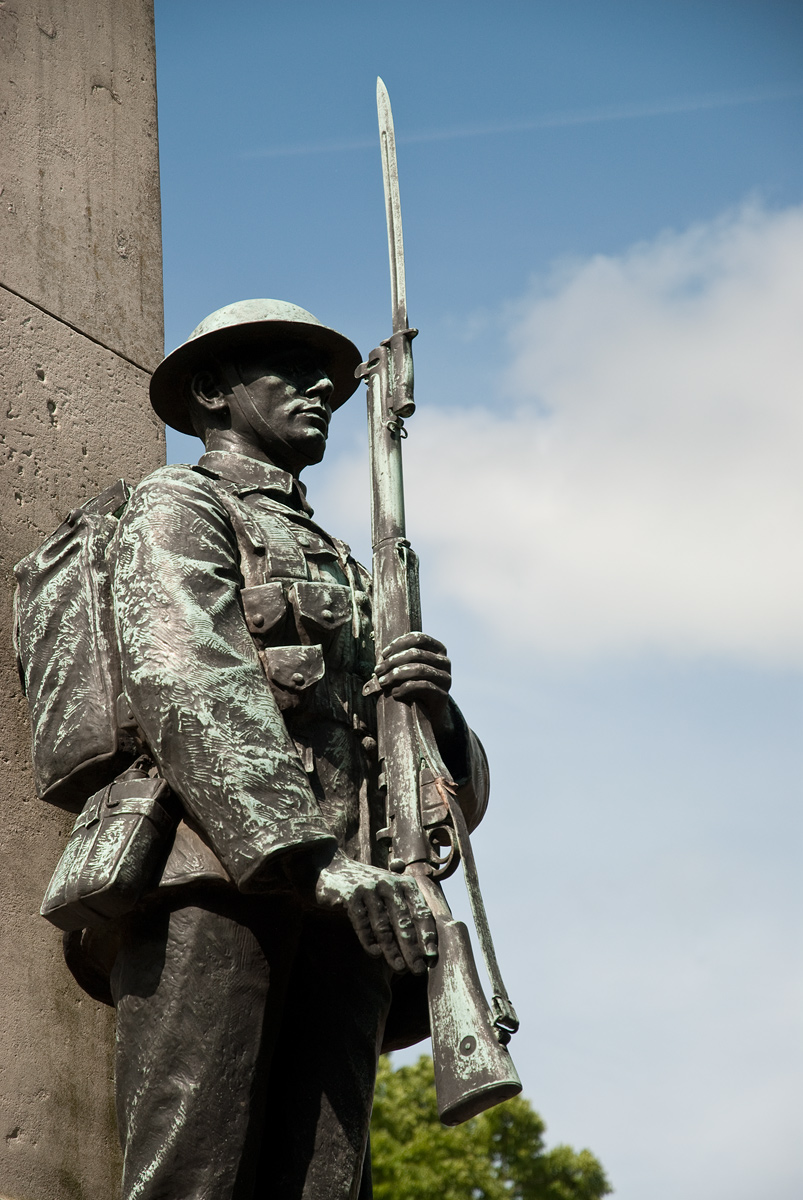
The soldier on Ilford War Memorial, Photograph shown courtesy Chris Guy.

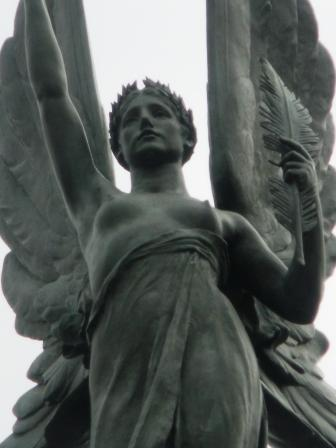
Bronze on New Barnet War Memorial

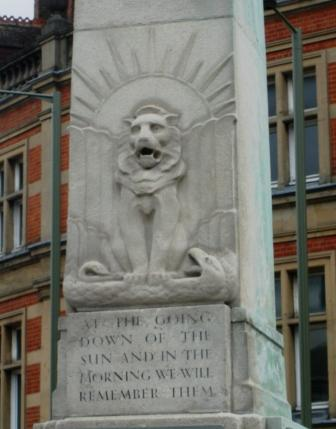
Carving on New Barnet War Memorial- The British Lion has slain the German Imperial Eagle.

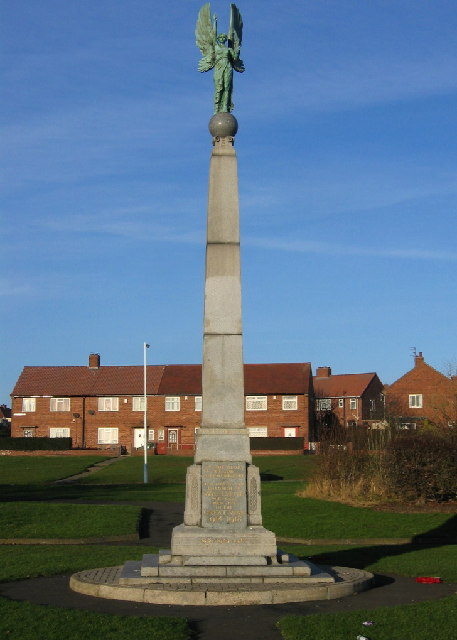
Wallsend War Memorial

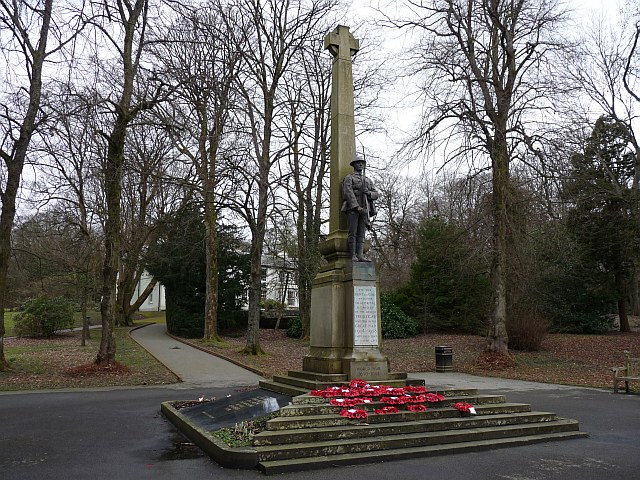
Tredegar War Memorial
