= William Edward Trent =

British architect (1874–1948)

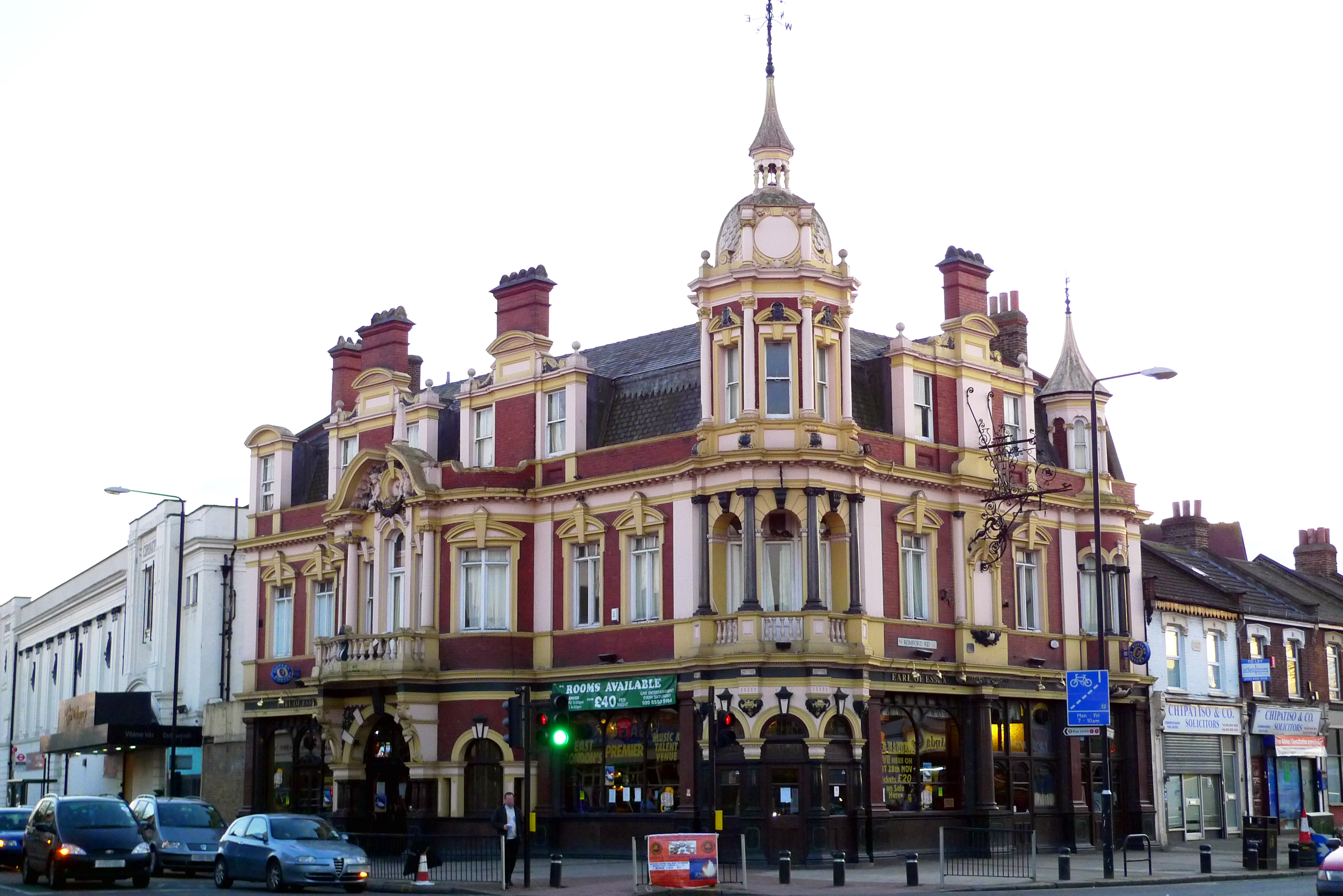
The Earl of Essex, built in 1902, seen in 2010.

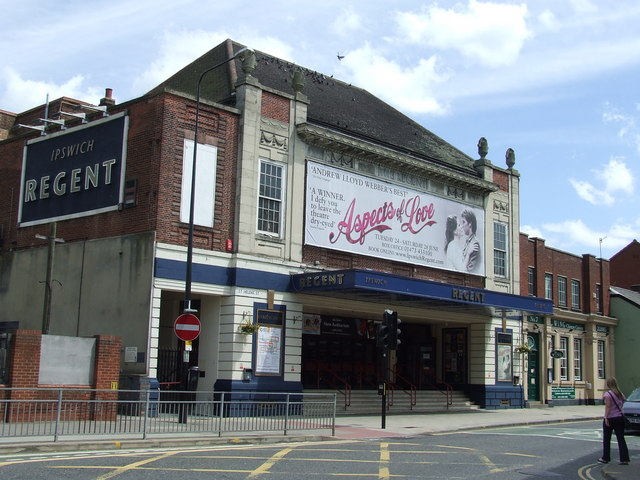
Regent Theatre, Ipswich, opened in 1929.

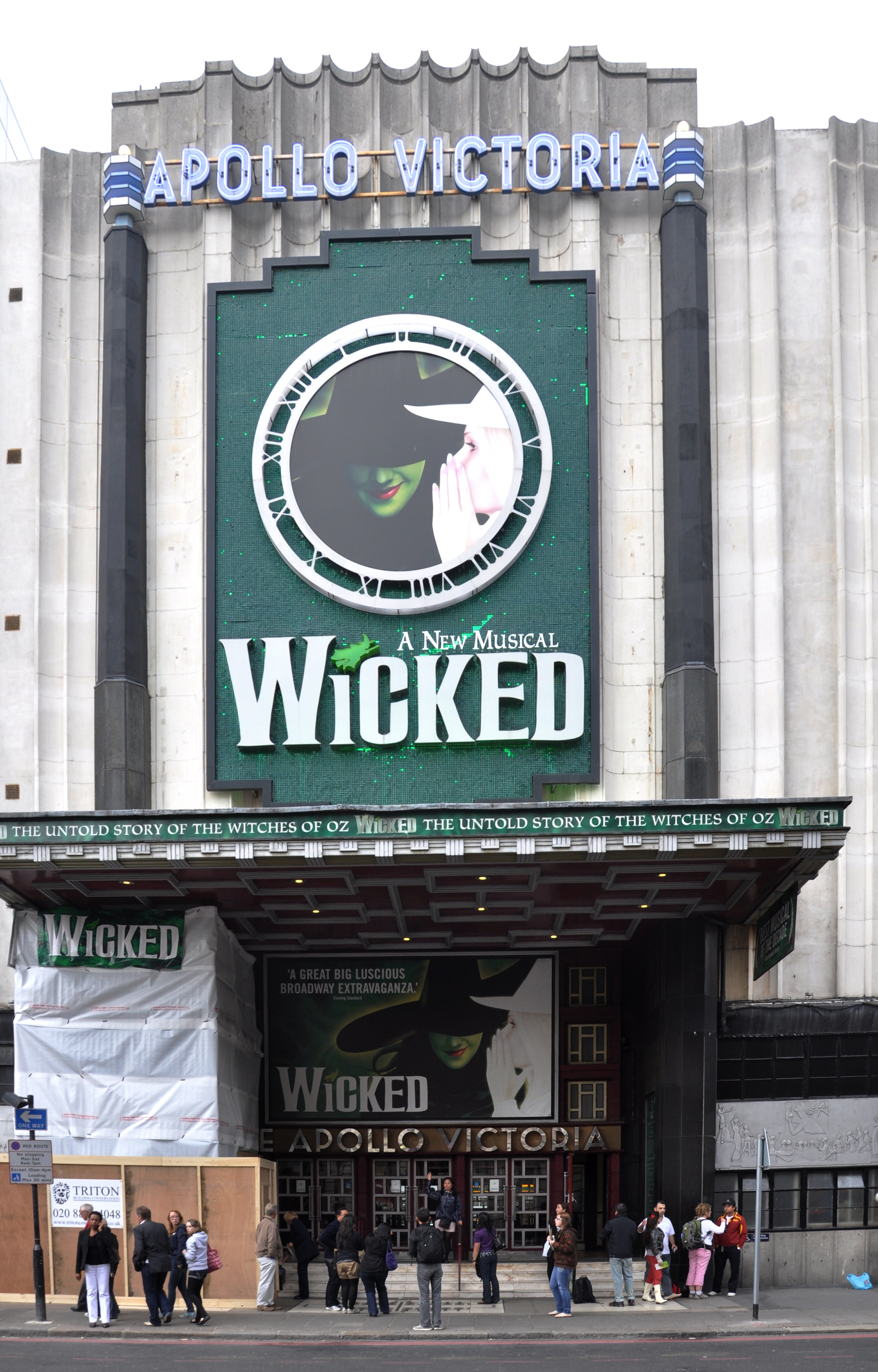
New Victoria Cinema, Westminster, London (now the Apollo Victoria), opened in 1930.

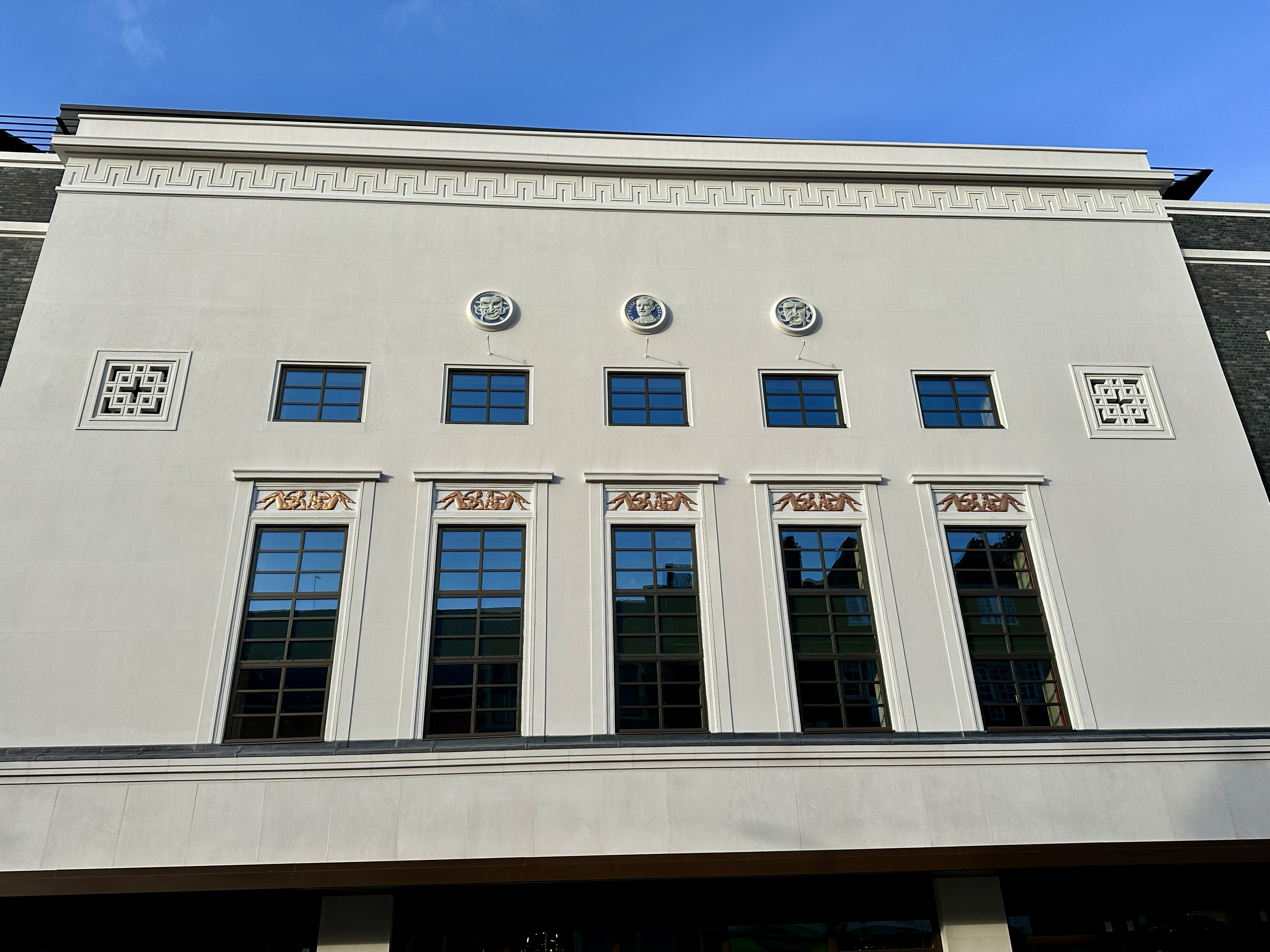
The Gaumont Palace, King's Road, Chelsea, London. Opened in 1934. Panels by Newbury Abbot Trent.

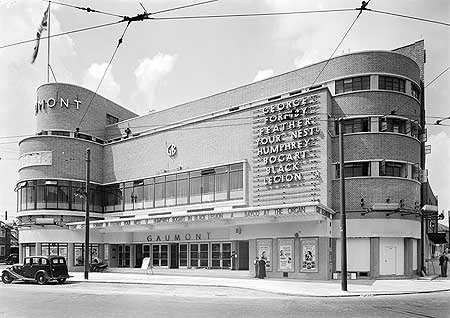
The Gaumont Theatre, North Finchley, London, seen at its opening in 1937. Demolished 1987.

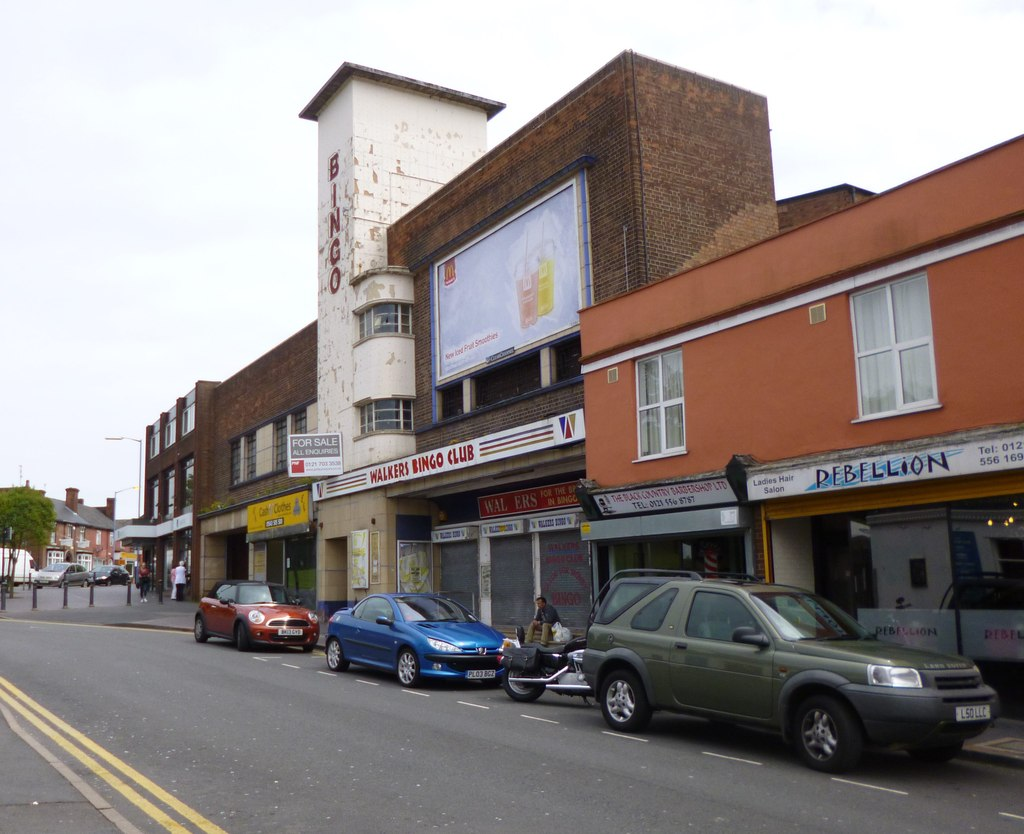
The Gaumont Cinema, Wednesbury, opened in 1938.

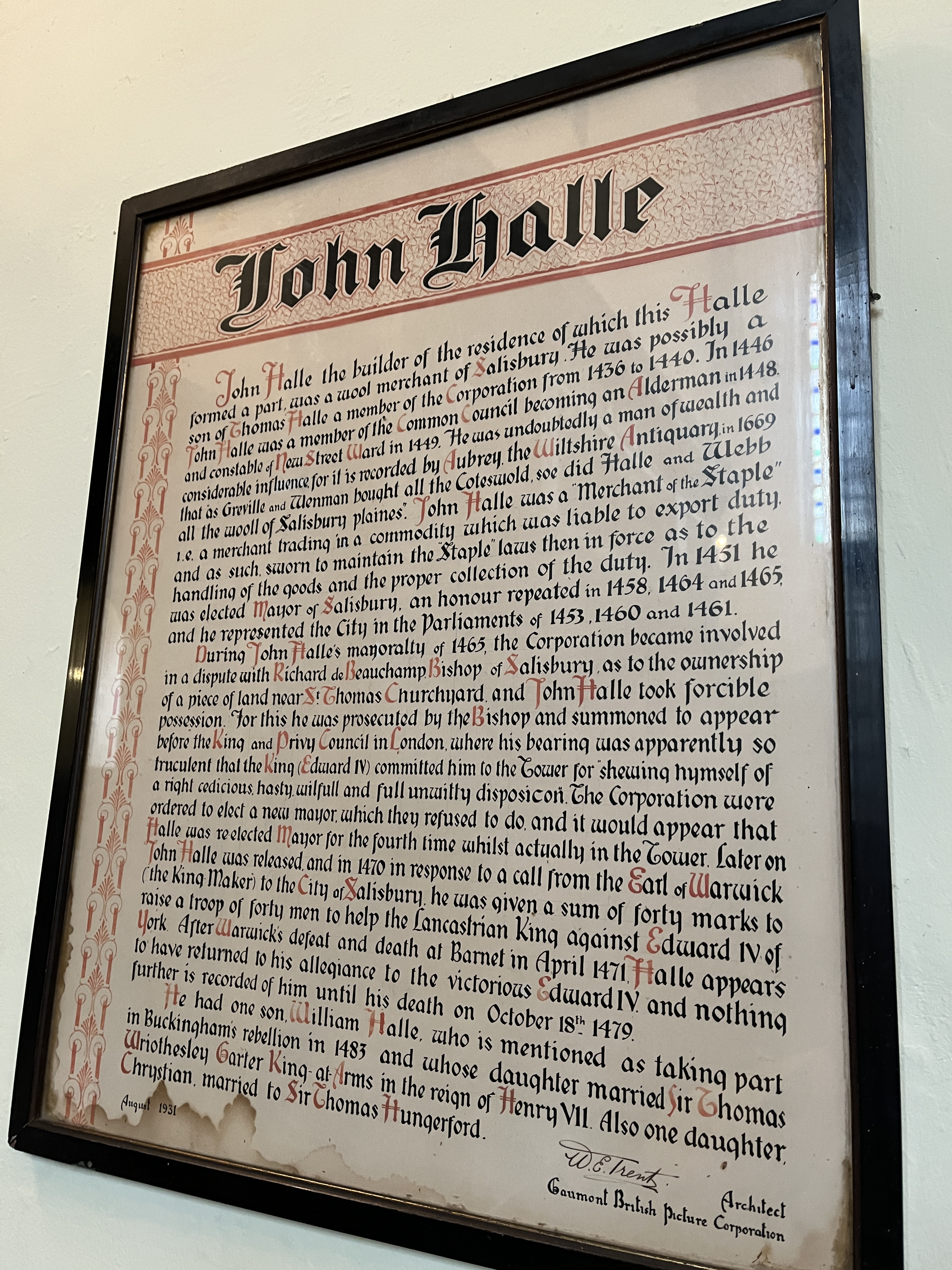
Information panel signed by Trent about the medieval hall house, John Halle's Hall, that was the foyer of the Trent-designed 1931 cinema in Salisbury.

William Edward Trent (1874–1948) was a British architect who specialised in cinema design. He is considered "one of the leading cinema designers in Britain" of his time, and is known for his Art Deco designs in particular.

== Early life ==
Trent's relative was the sculptor and medallist Newbury Abbot Trent. (Note: Some sources say Newbury Abbott Trent was his younger brother; others say his cousin.)

== Career ==
Trent was articled to Henry Poston of Lombard Street, London in 1892.

Trent and Poston were the architects of the Earl of Essex, a Grade II listed public house at 616 Romford Road, Manor Park, London, built in 1902.

Trent remained with Poston as his assistant until he started an independent practice in London in 1905.

From 1909, Trent specialised in cinema design. This led to his appointment first as the chief architect to Provincial Cinematograph Theatres (PCT) in 1925, and then as chief architect to the Gaumont British Picture Corporation, which took over PCT in 1929. These cinemas/theatres included the Regent Theatre, Ipswich (1929), Apollo Victoria Theatre (1930) and the Gaumont Finchley (1937), designed with the assistance of his son William Sidney Trent and R. Golding. In 1931 the new Gaumont Palace opened in Salisbury, designed in a mock-Tudor style by Trent to match the medieval hall house, John Halle's Hall, that formed the cinema's foyer. This was in contrast to the more modernist design of his other cinemas, which were often in an Art Deco style.

=== List of buildings designed by and works by Trent ===
This list is not complete. All buildings are cinemas, unless noted. NB: Names are those of Trent's buildings on their opening; many have different names today, and some of Trent's buildings were built on the site of earlier, differently-named cinemas and theatres. Some were co-designed with other architects (not named here).

- 1902. Earl of Essex pub, Manor Park, London. The pub is a Grade II listed building.
- 1909. Kingsland Palace of Animated Pictures, Dalston, London. Trent was commissioned by Clara Ludski to convert an auctioneer's shop into a silent cinema. The following year it was enlarged to include the neighbouring property: unclear if Trent was involved in this. Demolished 1915, and rebuilt as a new cinema (the Kingsland Empire) by architects Percy C. Adams & George Coles. In 1937 it was refurbished in the Art Deco style by architect F.E. Bromige. Now the Rio Cinema.
- 1921. Premier Super Cinema, East Ham, London. "The architect is usually given as William E. Trent, but there is some doubt that he was in charge of such a large project at that stage in his career (he did carry out a modernisation to the building later on)." Later known as the Gaumont. Closed 1963. Then Top Rank Bingo Club, Mecca Bingo, closed 2005. Demolished 2009.
- 1922. Ilford Super Cinema, Ilford. Demolished 1959.
- 1926. Regent Theatre, Weymouth. Extensive redesign of the Jubilee Hall by Trent, reopening as the Regent Theatre on 2 August 1926. Later known as the Gaumont, the Odeon. Demolished 1989.
- 1927. Regent Theatre, Sheffield. "The first major cinema designed by Trent". Later known as the Gaumont Theatre, closed 1985. Demolished 1985.
- 1928. New Victoria Theatre, Preston. Later known as the Gaumont Cinema, the Odeon Cinema, Clouds Nightclub; now Lava Ignite Nightclub.
- 1928. Regent Theatre, Dudley. Later known as the Gaumont Cinema, Top Rank Bingo Club; now The Venue.
- 1929. Regent Theatre, Bournemouth. Later known as the Gaumont Theatre, the Odeon; currently derelict.
- 1929. Regent Theatre, Queen's Road, Brighton. Redesign by Trent following a fire. Demolished 1974.
- 1929. Regent Theatre, Piccadilly, Hanley, Stoke-on-Trent. Later known as the Gaumont Theatre, the Odeon; now converted to a live theatrical venue and known again as the Regent Theatre. The cinema is a Grade II* listed building.
- 1929. Regent Theatre, Ipswich. Later known as the Gaumont Theatre, the Odeon; now converted to a live theatrical venue and known again as the Regent Theatre. The cinema is a Grade II listed building.
- 1929. Regent Theatre, Stamford Hill, London. Later known as Gaumont Theatre, the Odeon. Closed 1972. Demolished 1984.
- 1929. Regent Theatre, Swindon. Later known as the Gaumont Cinema, the Odeon, Top Rank Bingo Club, Mecca Bingo Club; now known as the M.E.C.A. (Music Entertainment Cultural Arena).
- 1930. Gaumont Palace, Saint Peter Port, Guernsey. Complete internal reconstruction by Trent. Later known as the Gaumont. Closed 1985. Demolished by 2016.
- 1930. Grand Cinema, Canning Town, London. Alterations carried out by Trent, mainly the installation of sound equipment. Demolished post-1940.
- 1930. New Victoria Cinema, Edinburgh. Later known as the Odeon, currently derelict. The cinema is a Category A listed building. It is currently on the Cinema Theatre Association's 'Cinemas at Risk' list.
- 1930. New Victoria Cinema, Westminster, London. Decorated with panels by Newbury Abbot Trent. Now the Apollo Victoria Theatre. The cinema is a Grade II* listed building.
- 1930. Palladium Cinema, Southport. Completely rebuilt by Trent after a fire at the New Palladium Cinema. Later known as the Gaumont Cinema, the Odeon. Demolished 1980.
- 1931. Gaumont Palace, Middlesbrough. Total rebuild of the interior of The Grand Opera House by Trent. Later known as the Gaumont. Closed 1964. Demolished 1964 or soon after.
- 1931. Gaumont Palace, New Canal, Salisbury. New cinema theatre building behind a medieval hall house, which serves as the cinema's foyer. Later known as the Gaumont Cinema; now the Odeon. The cinema is a Grade II listed building.
- 1932. Gaumont Palace, Lewisham, London. "The largest cinema designed by architect W.E. Trent". The arch on either side of the proscenium had a large female nude statue by Newbury Abbot Trent. Later known as the Gaumont Theatre, the Odeon. Closed 1981. Demolished 1991.
- 1932. Gaumont Palace, Wolverhampton. Later known as the Gaumont Cinema. Demolished 1974.
- 1933. Gaumont Palace, Cheltenham. Decorated with panels by Newbury Abbot Trent. Later known as the Gaumont Cinema, the Odeon. Demolished 2014. The frieze of the two naked women by Newbury Abbot Trent was saved, and is now on the back wall of another cinema in Cheltenham.
- 1933. Gaumont Palace, Wallasey. Later known as the Gaumont, Classic Cinema, Unit Four Cinemas, Apollo 6 Cinemas. Closed 2000. Demolished 2005.
- 1934. Gaumont Palace, King's Road, Chelsea, London. Decorated with panels by Newbury Abbot Trent. Later known as the Gaumont Theatre, the Odeon, the Chelsea Cinema; now the Curzon Chelsea Cinema.
- 1934. Gaumont Palace, Derby. Later known as the Gaumont Theatre, the Odeon, ABC Trocadero Entertainment Centre, the Cannon Cinema, Zanzibar Nightclub and Banquet Centre; now Cosmo restaurant.
- 1934. Gaumont Palace, Doncaster. Decorated with bas relief sculptures by Newbury Abbot Trent depicting “the making of a film, from the writing of the story, to the building of the sets, and lastly the shooting of the film”. Later known as the Gaumont Cinema, the Odeon. Demolished 2009. The frieze is premanently displayed in Sir Nigel Gresley Square, Doncaster.
- 1934. Gaumont Palace, Wood Green, London. Later known as the Gaumont Theatre, the Odeon, Top Rank Bingo Club, Mecca Bingo, the Dominion Centre church; now Rio Nightclub. The cinema is a Grade II* listed building.
- 1936. Gaumont Palace, Chippenham. Later known as the Gaumont, the Odeon, Classic Cinema. Cloed 1974. Later an unnamed store, an unnamed nightclub. c. 2002 foyer converted into flats, offices and shops. Demolished c. 2002 (auditorium only).
- 1936. Gaumont Palace Theatre, Regent's Park (actually Camden Town), London. Opened January 1937. Later known as the Gaumont Camden Town, the Odeon, Gate Cinema, Parkway Kings Cinema, Parkway Regency Cinema, the Odeon (again), closed February 2026. Scheduled for demolition; the Art Deco frontage on Parkway will be restored and preserved.
- 1937. Gaumont Cinema, Haymarket, London. A complete rebuild of the former Capitol Theatre. Opened 4 February 1937. Closed 10 June 1959. Demolished 1959 or soon after (Another cinema built on the site, the Odeon Haymarket).
- 1937. Gaumont Theatre, North Finchley, London. Decorated with panels by Newbury Abbot Trent, "elaborate bas-relief carvings in Portland stone ... considered the finest of his panels that he designed for several Gaumont Theatre’s at that time, it depicted the shooting of a film, with lights, camera, director and actors." Closed 1980. Demolished 1987. "The Museum of London [was] given permission to photograph the bas-relief panels on the exterior, but despite efforts to save them, they came down with the building and were lost."
- 1937. Gaumont Theatre, Trowbridge. Later known as the Odeon. Closed 1971. Demolished 1971 or post-1971.
- 1937. New Picture House, Fisherton Street, Salisbury. Later known as the Picture House, the Odeon; now the City Hall. Currently being redeveloped.
- 1938. Gaumont Cinema, Birkenhead. Closed 4 January 1964. Later known as the Top Rank Bingo Club, unnamed snooker club, unnamed roller skating rink, Furniture World furniture store; currently derelict.
- 1938. Gaumont Cinema, Chepstow. Retained the façade of the Beaufort Hotel. Later known as Regal Cinema. Closed 1971. Demolished 1989 apart from the façade.
- 1938. Gaumont Cinema, Wednesbury. Later known as the Odeon, Silver Cinema, unnamed bingo club, Walkers Bingo Club; currently derelict.
- 1938. Gaumont Coliseum, Leeds. Redesign of the interior of the 1885 Coliseum by Trent in Art Deco style. Closed 1961. Interiors removed in the ?1970s, so nothing of Trent's work remains. Later Top Rank Bingo Club, Playhouse Theatre rehearsal room, Norwood Studios at the Colosseum film and TV studio, Colosseum Nightclub, Town & Country Club, Creation Nightclub, Carling Academy; now O2 Academy Leeds.
- 1939. Academy Theatre, West Street, Brighton. Art Deco remodelling by Trent. Closed 1973. Demolished 1974.
- 1939. Crouch End Hippodrome, Crouch End, London. Substantial alterations by Trent. Closed end of April 1942 after a fire. Later an unnamed dancing school, an unnamed storage facility, Grattan mail order company distribution centre. Demolished in or before the early 2000s, apart from the facade and foyer.
- 1939. Gaumont Cinema, Frome. Later known as Classic Cinema. Demolished 1971.
- 1946. Gaumont Palace, Peterborough. Alterations and refurbishment by Trent. Later known as the Gaumont. Closed 1963. Later known as Top Rank Bingo Club, Surewin Bingo Club, closed 1983. Demolished 1987.

=== Listed buildings by Trent ===
Listed buildings are those deemed of architectural or historical interest deserving of special protection. Such buildings are placed on one of the four statutory lists maintained by Historic England in England, Historic Environment Scotland in Scotland, Cadw in Wales, and the Historic Environment Division of the Department for Communities in Northern Ireland. In England the highest rank is Grade 1, followed by Grade 2* and then Grade 2. In Scotland, Category A is the highest rank.

Grade 2* (England)

- 1929. Regent Theatre, Piccadilly, Hanley, Stoke-on-Trent.
- 1930. New Victoria Cinema, Westminster, London. Now the Apollo Victoria Theatre.
- 1934. Gaumont Palace, Wood Green, London. Now Rio Nightclub.

Grade 2 (England)

- 1902. Earl of Essex pub, Manor Park, London.
- 1929. Regent Theatre, Ipswich.
- 1931. Gaumont Palace, New Canal, Salisbury. Now the Odeon.

Category A (Scotland)

- 1930. New Victoria Cinema, Edinburgh. Later known as the Odeon, currently derelict. It is currently on the Cinema Theatre Association's 'Cinemas at Risk' list.

== Personal life ==
Trent's son William Sidney Trent (1903–1944) was also an architect. When his father became a full-time employee of PCT, his son took over his private practice, retaining him as a consultant. However, he joined Gaumont British in 1932 to help his father with the huge increase in work with the advent of talking pictures.
