= Gaumont Finchley =

Coordinates: 51.6150°N 0.1764°W

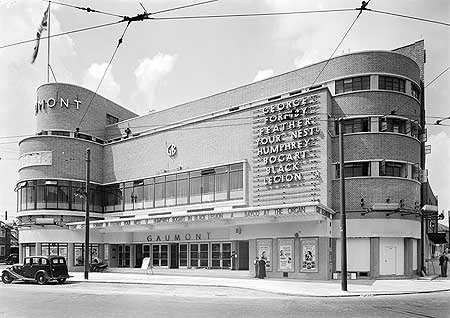
Gaumont Finchley, 1937.

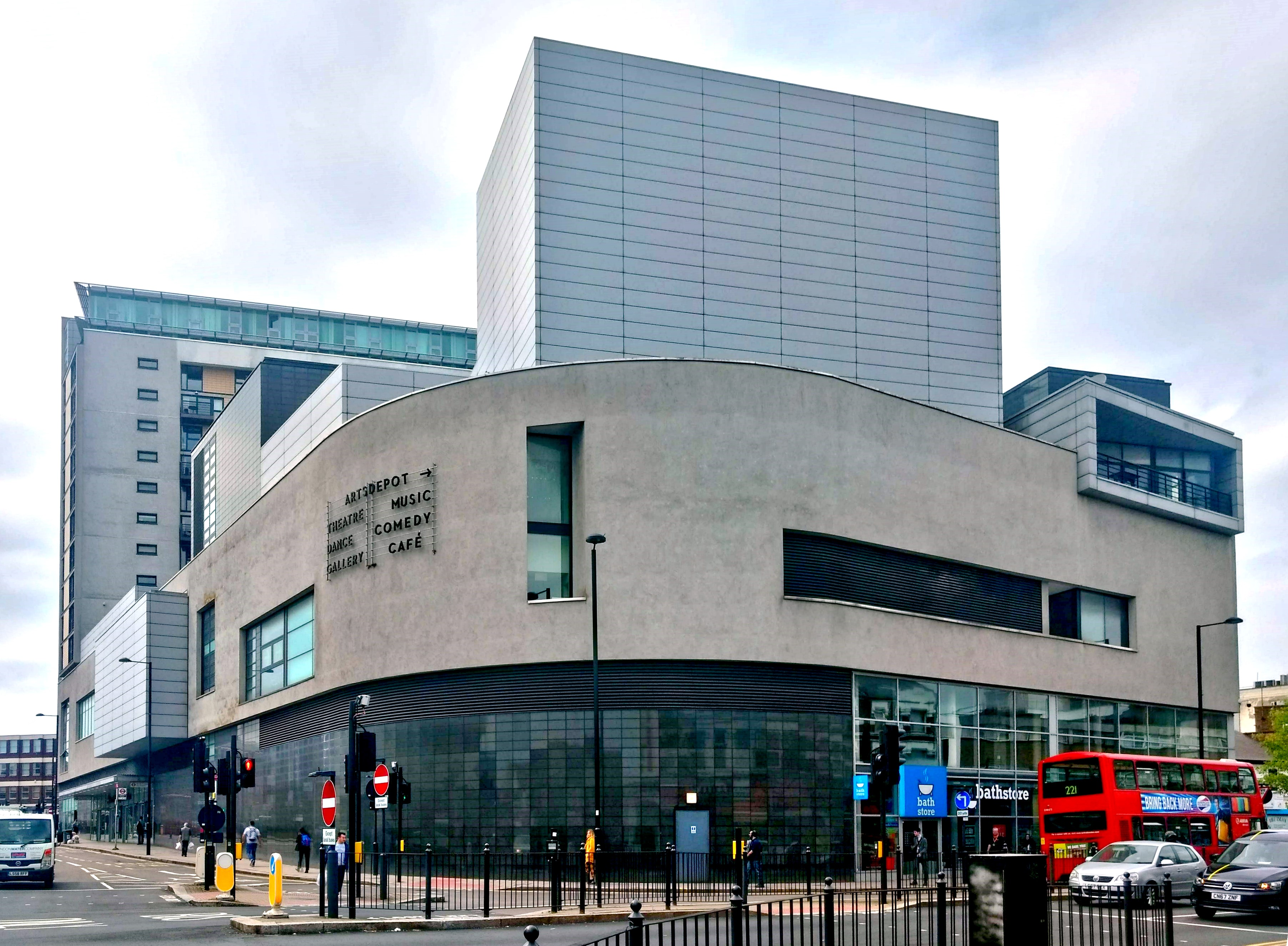
The current Artsdepot on the site

The Gaumont Finchley was an architecturally notable cinema in north Finchley, London. It opened in 1937 and closed in 1980, before being demolished in 1987.

== History ==
The Gaumont was designed by W. E. Trent, architect of the Gaumont British Picture Corporation, with the assistance of his son W. Sidney Trent and R. Golding, and built by McLaughlin & Harvey. The electrical engineer was S. Hart. It was opened by the mayor of Finchley in 1937 and closed in 1980. It was demolished in 1987 and replaced by the Finchley artsdepot.

== See also ==
- Apollo Victoria Theatre, another W.E. Trent design.
- Phoenix Cinema, East Finchley, a nearby Art Deco cinema.
