= Earl of Essex, Manor Park =

Pub in Manor Park, London

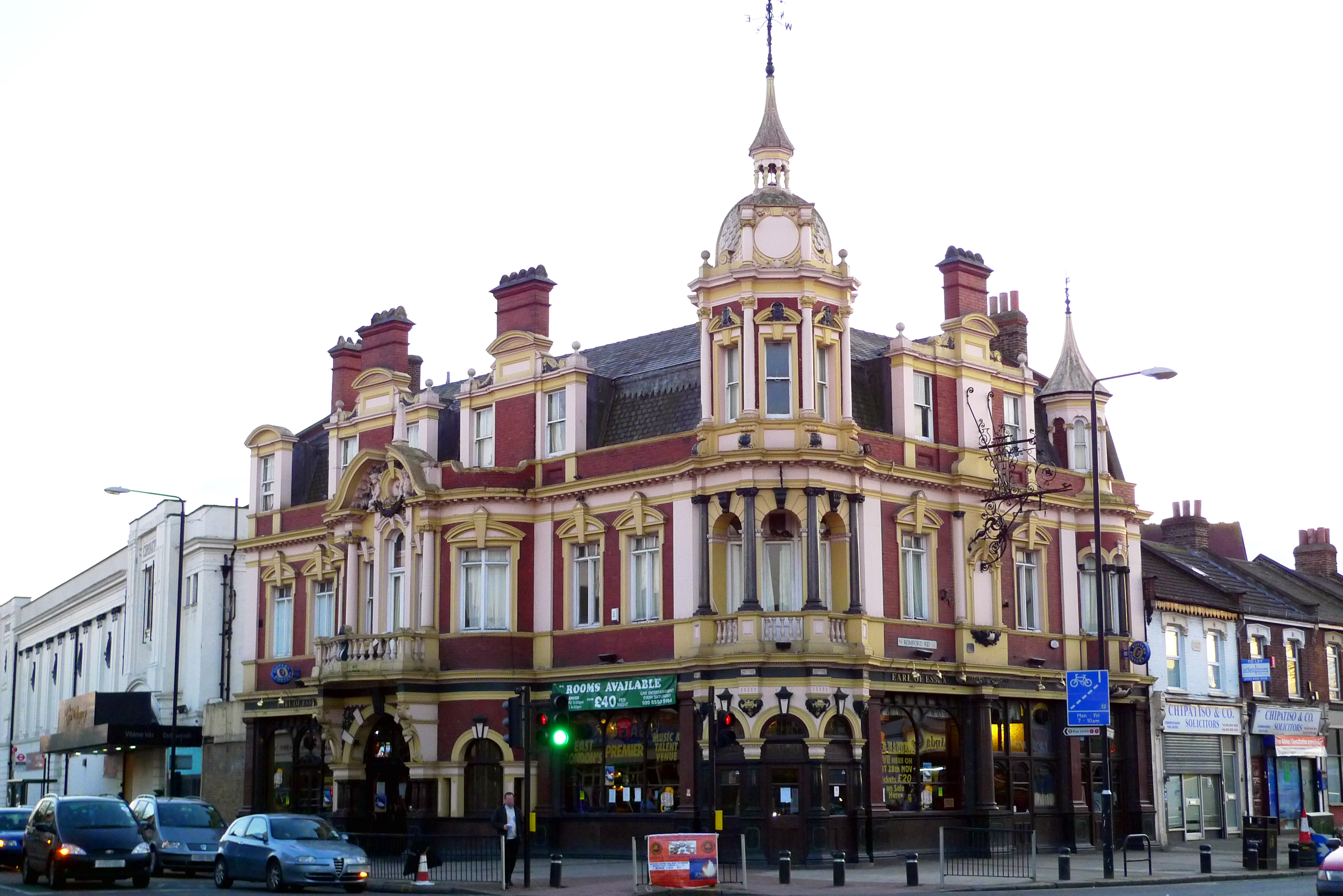
- The Earl of Essex

- Location within London Borough of Newham Location within Greater London

General information
- Location: 616 Romford Road, Manor Park, London, England
- Coordinates: 51°33′01″N 0°02′51″E

Design and construction
- Designations

Listed Building – Grade II
- Official name: Earl of Essex Public House
- Designated: 25 October 1984
- Reference no.: 1357990

The Earl of Essex is a Grade II listed public house at 616 Romford Road, Manor Park, London.

It was built in 1902 by the architects Henry Poston and William Edward Trent.

The pub has been closed since 2012, and as of April 2016, it is hoped to reopen in the near future.
