= Peace Statue, Brighton =

1912 monument by Newbury Abbot Trent

Edward VII Memorial
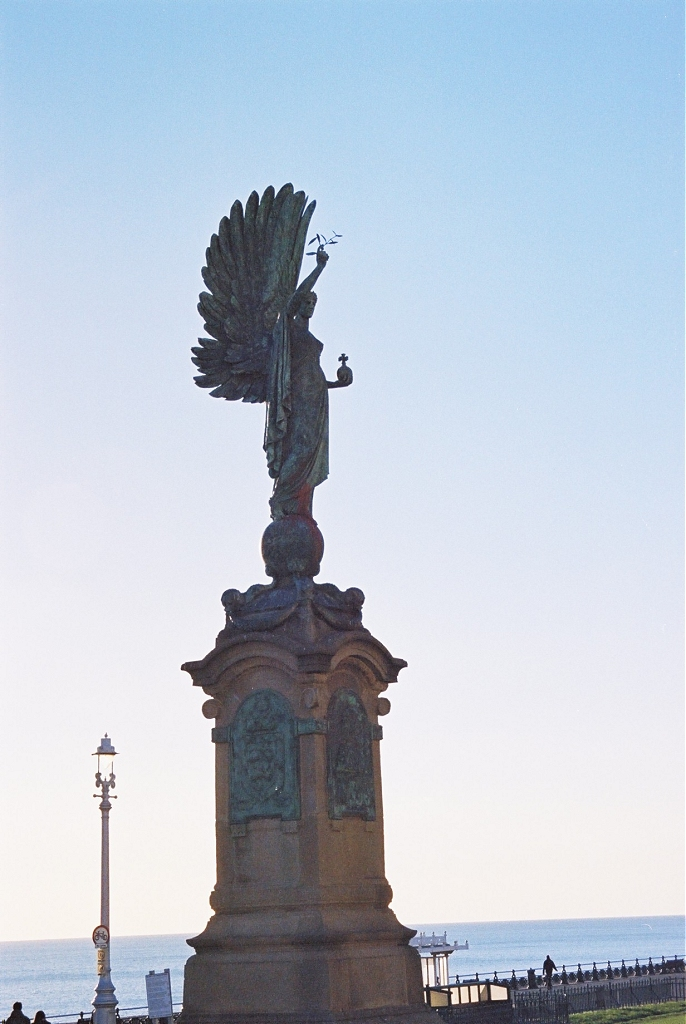
- The statue in 2007
- Artist: Newbury Abbot Trent
- Year: 1912
- Completion date: 12 October 1912
- Medium: Bronze
- Subject: Edward VII
- Dimensions: 8.2 m (27 ft)
- Designation: Grade II listed building
- Location: Brighton/Hove, England; 50.822519°N 0.156957°W

The Edward VII Memorial, commonly known as the Peace Statue or Peace Memorial, is a statue on the boundary of Brighton and Hove on the English south coast. The monument was built in 1912 and sculpted by Newbury Abbot Trent.

== Background ==
Edward VII frequented Brighton and Hove; unlike his mother, Queen Victoria, Edward was fond of the area. He convalesced there several times and spent considerable time there in his last few years. He was nicknamed "the Peacemaker" for his efforts to improve Britain's relations abroad. When he died in 1910, the borough councils of Brighton and Hove agreed to collaborate on a memorial.

There was public appetite to remember the king after his death but the form of the memorial was the subject of much public discussion. The two borough councils were keen to provide something for the working poor as well as a monument. They formed a committee, which included both mayors and both town clerks, and agreed that money raised from public subscriptions in memory of the king would be put towards a home for the Queen's Nurses on Wellington Road in Brighton and a monument to Edward. Of the £2,700 raised, £1,800 was allocated to the nurses' home and £900 to the monument (the eventual cost was £1,000). The design was decided by open competition. Newbury Abbot Trent was chosen from 18 entries. A wooden mock-up of the monument stood on the site for a year before construction started.

== Design ==
The statue straddles the boundary between Brighton and Hove on Kingsway (named for Edward VII) facing Brunswick Terrace with its back to the sea. It is a bronze statue standing on a globe atop a pedestal of Derbyshire granite. The statue takes the form of a draped, winged figure of Victory. Victory stands on a globe, also in bronze, which is supported by dolphins at the four corners of the pedestal. The dolphins, a symbol of Brighton, have swags (decorative tree branches) in their mouths. Victory holds an olive branch in her outstretched right hand and an orb (a symbol of sovereignty) in her left. The figure was intended to represent peace but is part of a long tradition of using the Greek goddess Nike as an allegorical figure of victory, traditionally a good omen descending on the Earth. The statue is "a prominent feature" of the Brunswick Lawns – the open space between Brunswick Terrace and the seafront.

The pedestal contains elaborate decoration. On each face of the pedestal is a bronze plaque beneath a moulded cornice. On the front (north) side, facing Brunswick Terrace is a relief portrait of Edward VII. The arms of Brighton and Hove feature on the east and west sides respectively. At the bottom is a set of three steps which stand in the centre of a square patch of grass which is surrounded by low bronze railings. The monument is 27 feet (8.2 metres) tall in total, of which about 10 feet (3 metres) is the statue and the rest is the pedestal.

Trent's signature appears in one corner of the globe and at the base of the pedestal. Beneath the relief of the king is the inscription "Edward VII 1901–1910". On the east side is Brighton's motto, "In Deo Fidemus" ("in God we trust") and on the west is Hove's motto, "Floreat Hova" ("may Hove flourish"). The main inscription is embossed on a bronze panel on the back (south face) of the pedestal:

IN THE YEAR 1912 THE INHABITANTS OF BRIGHTON AND HOVE PROVIDED A HOME FOR THE QUEEN'S NURSES AND ERECTED THIS MONUMENT IN MEMORY OF KING EDWARD VII AND AS A TESTIMONY OF THEIR ENDURING LOYALTY

The monument was built by Kirkpatrick Bros. of Manchester and the bronze was cast by A. B. Burton, who was responsible for many nationally significant monuments, including the Victoria Memorial in London. At the architect's suggestion, a railing was built around the base of the monument in summer 1913 at an additional cost of £200.

== History ==
The statue was unveiled by the Duke of Norfolk, the Lord Lieutenant of Sussex, on 12 October 1912. Large crowds gathered for the unveiling of both the statue and the nurse's home on Wellington Road, which the duke inaugurated on the same day. The duke emphasised the importance of a monument to peace at a time of rising tension in Europe and a widespread fear that war was looming. Among the attendees were the mayors of both Brighton and Hove and many local dignitaries. They sung hymns including "O God, Our Help in Ages Past", accompanied by the Royal Artillery Band, and the Bishop of Chichester, Charles Ridgeway, offered a dedicatory prayer. Several speeches were given, after which the unveiling party proceeded to Wellington Road. The bishop remarked that the monument was the product of cooperation between Brighton and Hove, two towns that were historic rivals.

The quadriga on the Wellington Arch in London was installed the same year, featuring another figure of Victory. Edward took a keen interest in that work before his death. The monument was well received in the local press. The Brighton Herald called it an "artistic addition to two towns that are not rich in beautiful statuary". Following the First World War, the monument was often mistaken for a war memorial. Locally, it was regarded as a symbol of successful collaboration between Brighton and Hove despite their past differences.

The monument was designated a Grade II listed building, a status which provides legal protection from demolition or unauthorised modification, on 13 October 1952, the day after the 40th anniversary of its unveiling. Hove Borough Council took responsibility for the statue's maintenance until 1997, when the two boroughs were combined into the unitary authority (and later city) of Brighton and Hove.

== See also ==
- Royal Sussex Regiment Memorial, Brighton
- Statue of Queen Victoria, Hove
- Grade II listed buildings in Brighton and Hove: S
- List of public art in Brighton and Hove
