= Henry Poston =

British architect (1849/50–1908)

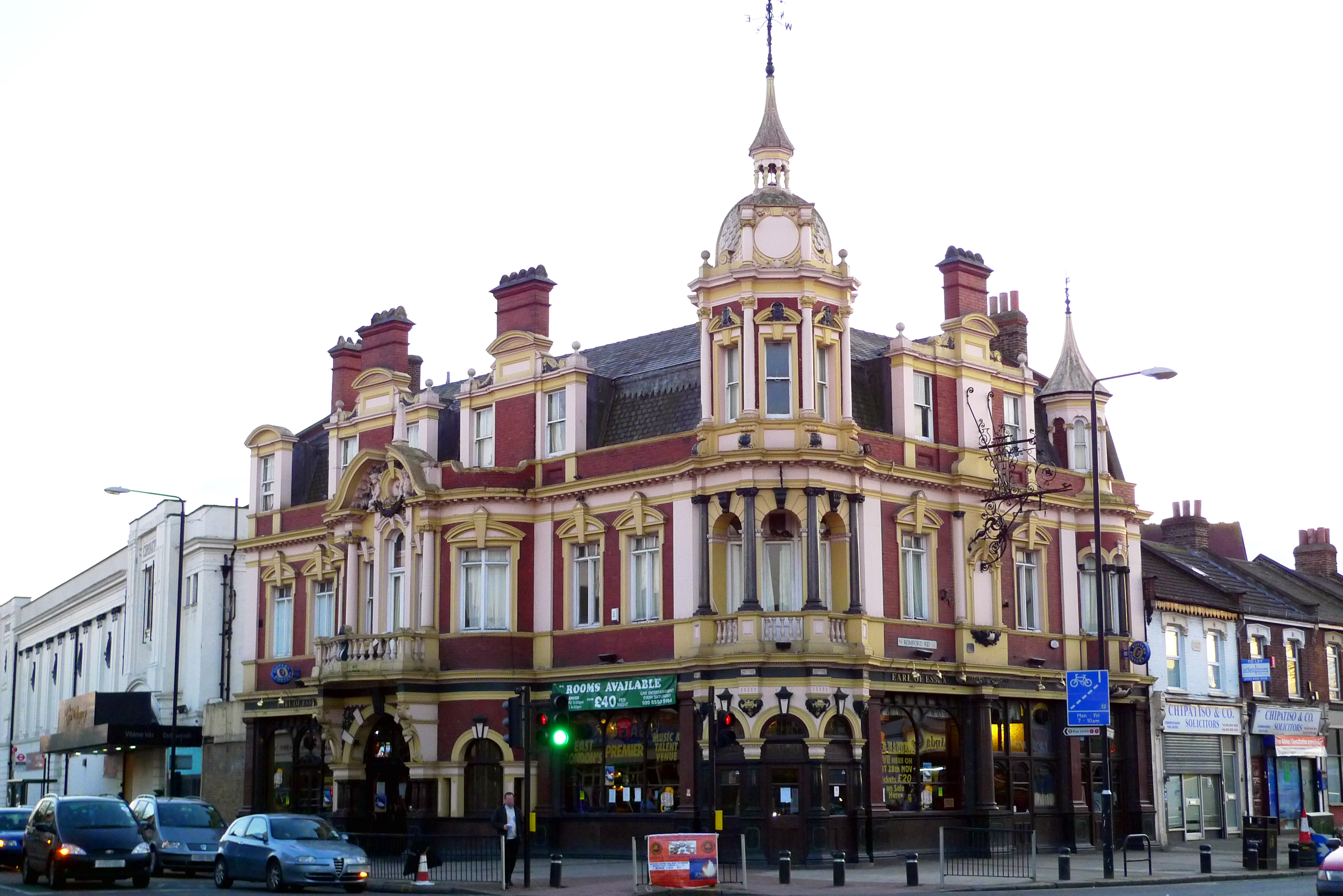
The Earl of Essex

Henry Poston (1849/50 – 1908) was a British architect.

Together with William Edward Trent, who was his apprentice, and then his assistant, he was the architect for the Earl of Essex, a Grade II listed public house at 616 Romford Road, Manor Park, London, built in 1902.

Poston was also the architect for the Pigeons Hotel, Romford Road, Stratford, built in 1898, and now converted to residential accommodation.
