= Phoenix Cinema =

Cinema in East Finchley, Barnet, London

Coordinates: 51.5885°N 0.1639°W

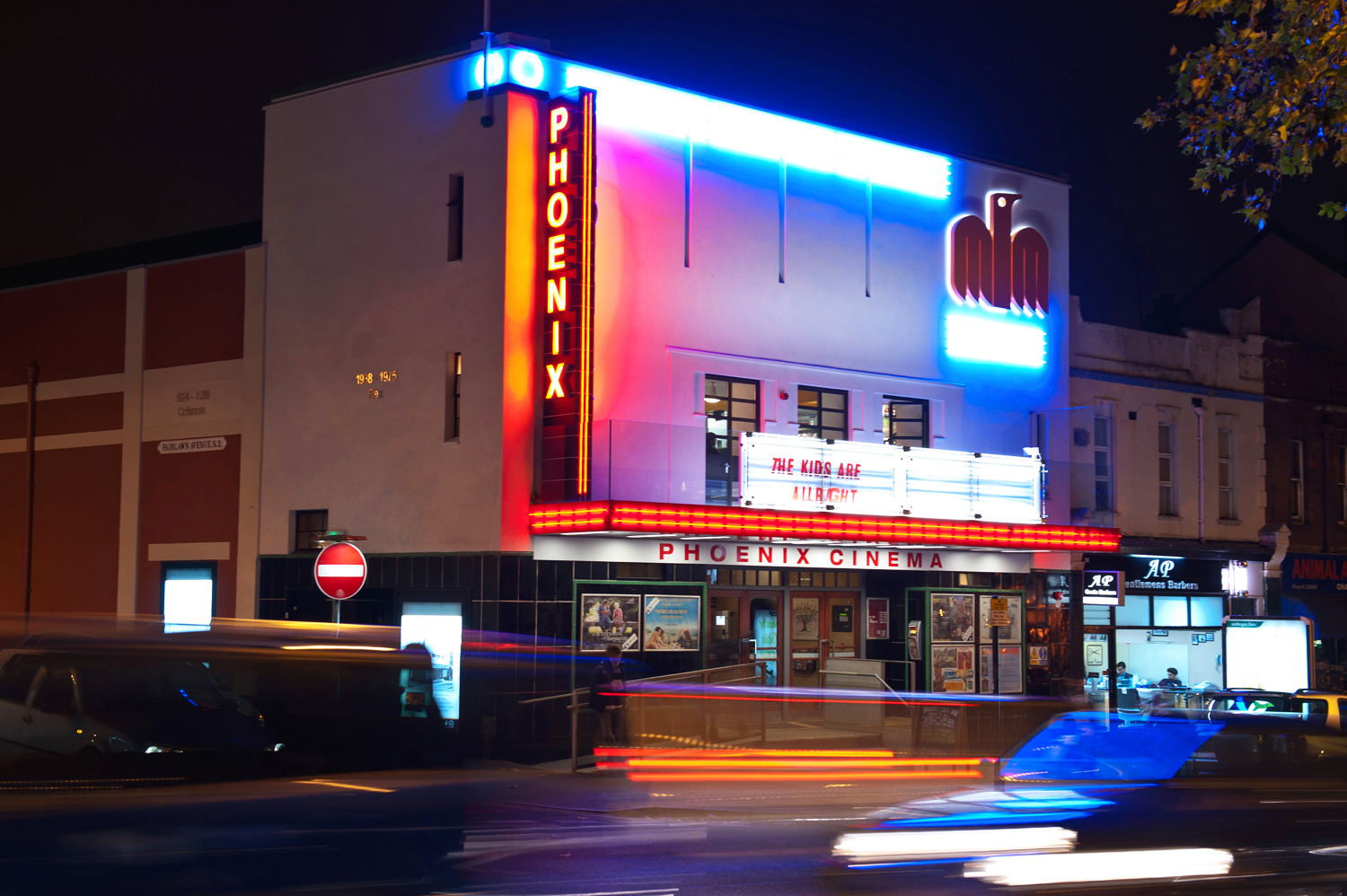
Phoenix Cinema night view.

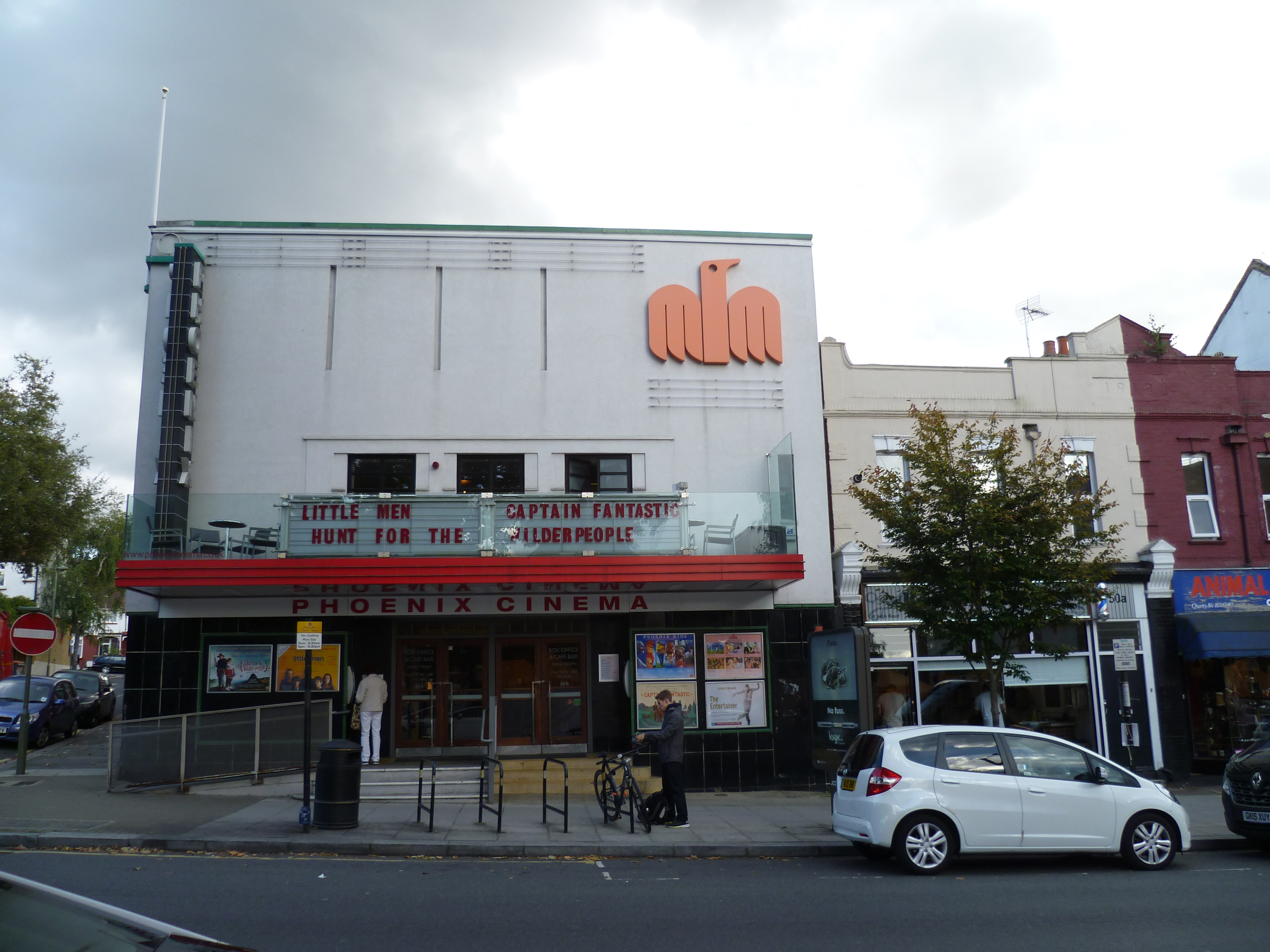
Daytime view

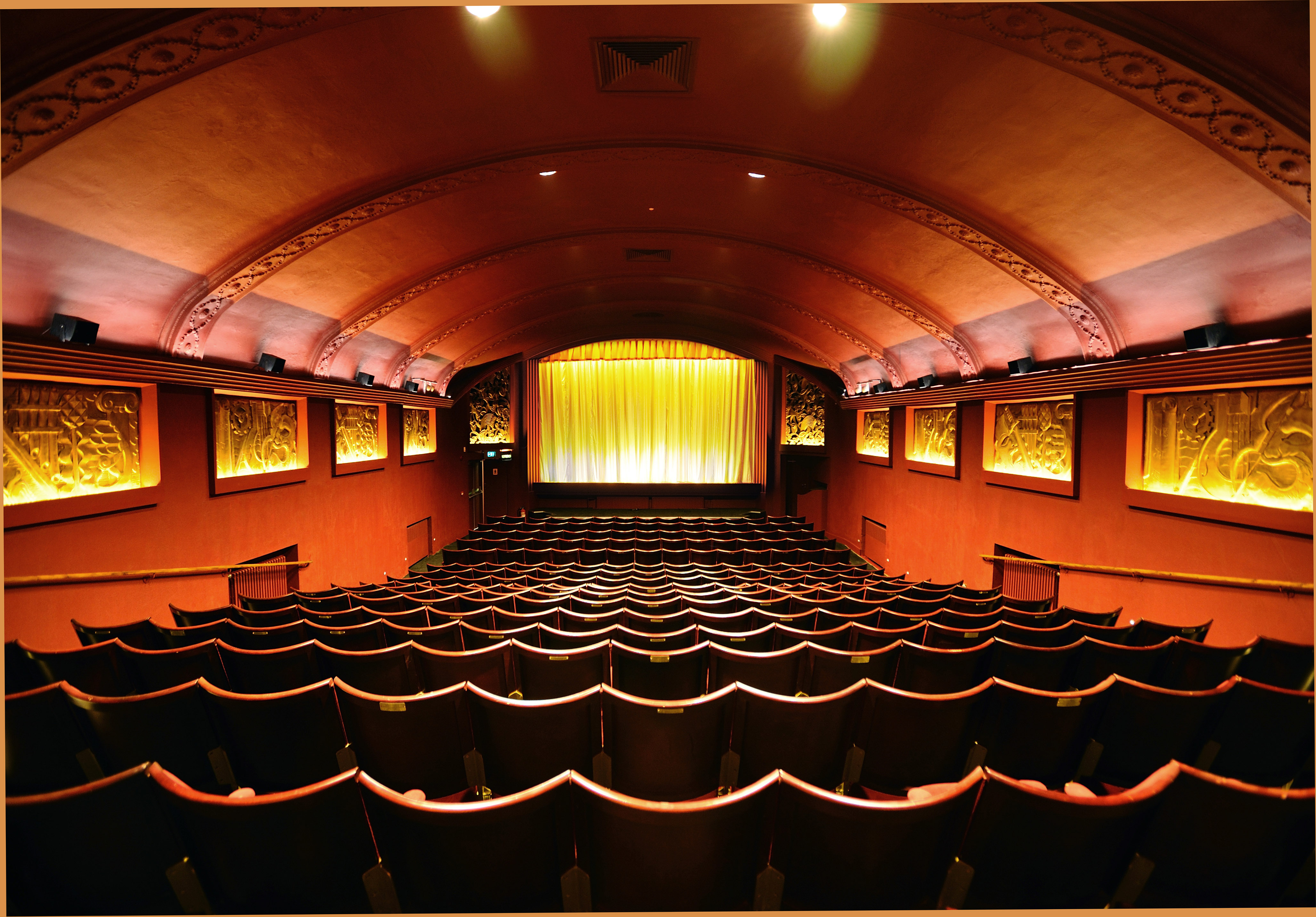
The auditorium

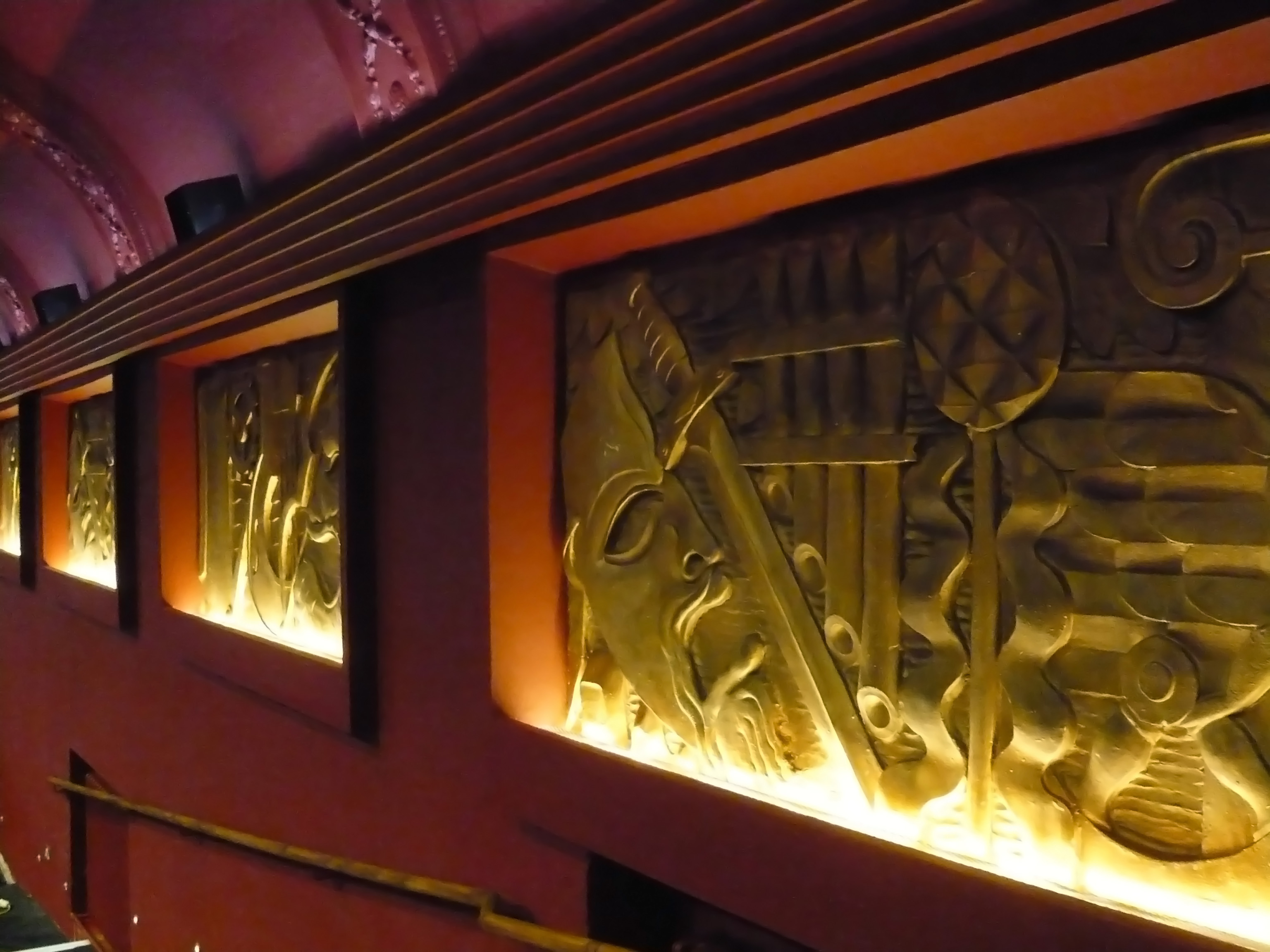
Auditorium art deco panels

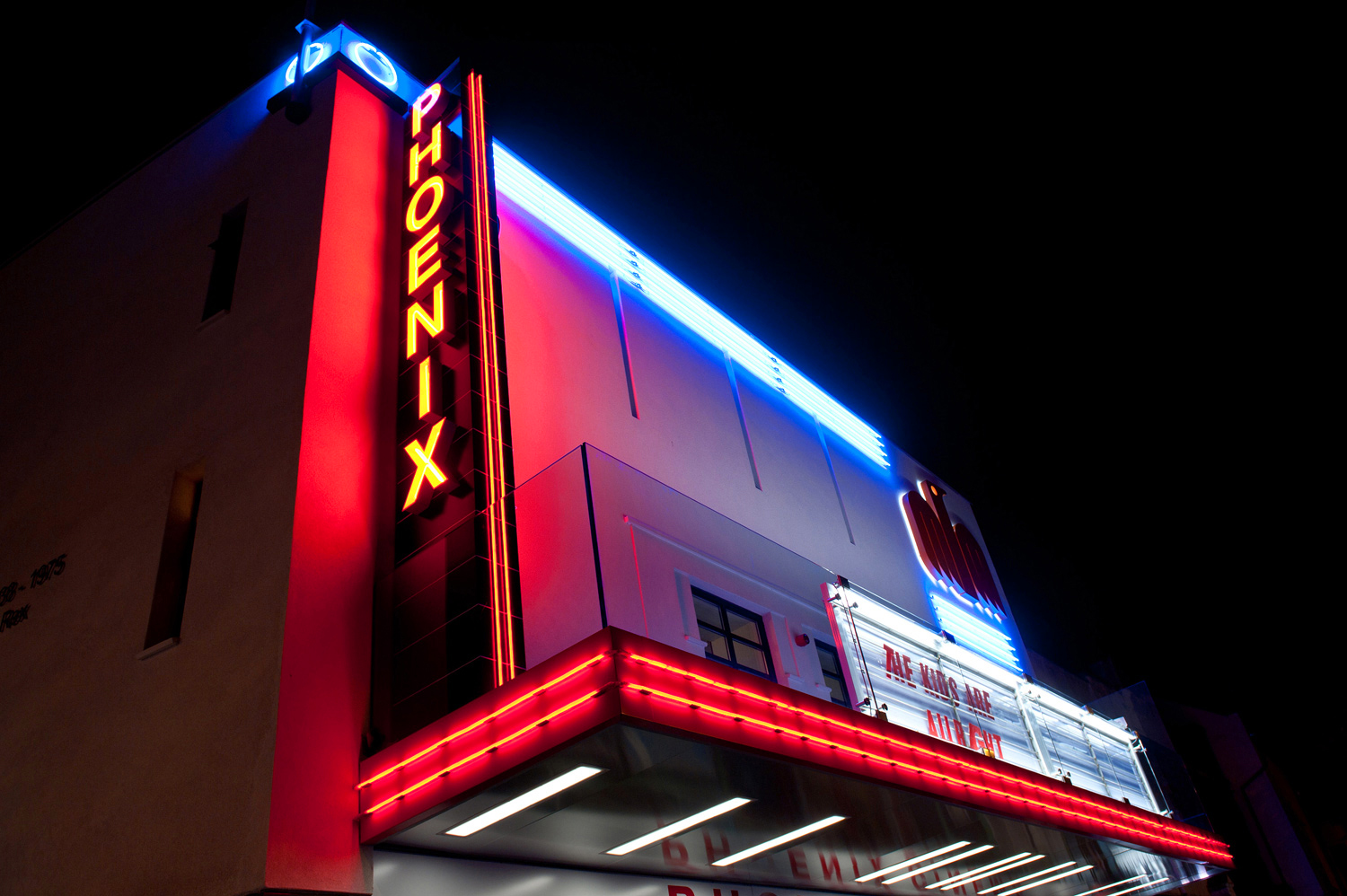
Exterior frontage

The Phoenix Cinema is an independent single-screen community cinema in East Finchley, London, England. It was built in 1910 and opened in 1912 as the East Finchley Picturedrome. It is one of the oldest continuously-running cinemas in the UK and shows mainly art-house films.

It is distinctive on East Finchley's high road by its large neon sign on the side of the building. The cinema's patrons are Benedict Cumberbatch, Maureen Lipman, Judi Dench, Michael Palin, Bill Paterson and Mark Kermode. It is run by a charity as a community cinema.

== History ==
=== The Picturedrome (1910–1923) ===
The Cinematograph Act 1909 introduced laws to make cinemas safer. As a result, more purpose-built cinemas began to appear from 1910 onwards including this one. The Phoenix Cinema was built in 1910 by Premier Electric Theatres, however the company went bankrupt before the cinema could be opened. In 1912, the building was purchased by businessmen who had been involved in setting up East Sheen Picturedrome. They finally opened it as 'The East Finchley Picturedrome' in May 1912 with 428 seats. The first screening was of a film about the Titanic which had recently sunk. The natural fall of the land was used for the sloped seating with the screen at the High Road end.

=== The Coliseum (1924–1936) ===
In 1924, the cinema's name changed to the "Coliseum". In 1925, the cinema was sold to Home Counties Theatres Ltd, which also owned the Athenaeum Picture Playhouse and the Summerland Cinema, both in Muswell Hill. At this time, the typical programme was silent movies accompanied by live music, plus variety acts such as singers, magicians and comedians. But in 1928, British cinema went through a huge transformation when the first sound film, The Jazz Singer, featuring the voice of the film's star Al Jolson, premiered in the Piccadilly Theatre, London. Cinemas across London started the transition to sound and on 22 July 1929 this cinema was the first in the area to show a sound film, screening Al Jolson's The Singing Fool.

=== The Rex (1937–1975) ===
In 1937, the building was redesigned and rebuilt in an Art Deco style and reopened as the "Rex" in September 1938. The alterations of 1938 were a response to competition from 1000 seater "picture palaces" being built by chains such as Odeon, ABC and Gaumont in the surrounding area.

Cinema interior designers Mollo & Egan redesigned the auditorium. The original 1910 barrel vaulted ceiling was retained, but decorative Art Deco panels were added along the walls. The auditorium was reversed, with the screen moving to the opposite end. This involved considerable alteration to the flooring to create a rake for the seating. The colour scheme, like today, was red, bronze and gold. The number of seats increased to 528. A projection box was built over the foyer to satisfy the requirements of the Cinematograph Act 1909, with shutters over the windows to the auditorium which could be closed in case of fire. Kershaw Kalee II arc film projectors with RCA sound heads and an RCA high-fidelity 6-valve amplifier were installed. Behind the screen were two RCA loudspeakers, where they remained for over 60 years. Modern heating and ventilation systems were also installed. These alterations together with the improved sight lines from the seating raised the standard of the Rex to meet those of its north London competitors.

The front of the cinema was transformed by architects Howes & Jackman with a move to the sleek lines of 1930s art deco architecture. The turrets and decorative plasterwork were removed to give the exterior a more 'modern' look. Glazed black tiles set against cream plaster and a new canopy stretching across the width of the cinema were accompanied by a neon sign with the new name, The Rex.

The Rex opened as an independent cinema compiling its own programmes, unlike the nearby chain cinemas, whose schedules were decided by their allied production companies.

Advertising from 1938 reassured the public that "If it is good it's on our screen". There was a full programme with a double-bill of two features, a major and minor release, a short and a newsreel, all at the same prices as the chains. Advertising, neglected by the Coliseum, was embraced by The Rex and it was always keeping up with innovations from the larger distributors.

The Rex's programming policy in the late 1930s allowed it to tailor its presentations to its public's tastes. British films were therefore favoured and popular films were presented that had previously gone round the big circuits, allowing patrons to see films they had missed elsewhere or to see a favourite film a second time around. Sunday showings of older films and a standard mid-week change of programme (when the circuits were holding a film for a whole week) provided a rich diet for even the most enthusiastic cinemagoer.

In 1973 the Rex was acquired by the Granada Group. The programming policy changed to commercial circuit releases and the previously steady increase in admissions stalled. The EFNA (East Finchley Neighbourhood Association) produced a petition and an accusatory article, Granada Wrecks the Rex, was published by Keith Lumley resulting in a new owner and a programming policy reversal.

=== The Phoenix (1975–present) ===
The cinema took its current name in 1975 when it was purchased and run by the distribution company Contemporary Films and concentrated on independent, foreign and specialist films, as it does today.

By 1983, audience patterns were changing and Contemporary Films considered that the cinema was no longer economically viable. Charles Cooper, owner of Contemporary Films, wanted to sell the cinema and retire. Upon his retirement, the fate of the cinema hung very much in the balance. In 1983, a property company applied to Barnet Council for planning permission to build an office block on the site occupied by the cinema. The Barnet Planning Committee approved the development but the Greater London Council rejected the proposal. After the consequent public inquiry in April 1984 permission for the office block was granted. Following widespread opposition by local residents (with the patronage of Maureen Lipman) the GLC offered a grant to the Trust to purchase the cinema in June 1985. The building and adjoining land were bought by the Trust in December 1985.

In 1999 an English Heritage review resulted in some thirty cinemas acquiring listed status in recognition of their historic and architectural importance. English Heritage recognised the importance of the Phoenix's original 1910 barrel-vaulted ceiling and the 1938 Mollo and Egan decorative wall panels and in 2000 the cinema received a Grade II listing. As one of the earliest purpose-built cinemas in the UK and one of even fewer still operating as a cinema, the Phoenix is therefore protected from demolition or damaging alterations.

In May 2024, during the Gaza war, Ken Loach and Mike Leigh resigned as patrons of the cinema in protest at its hosting of the Seret Film Festival, an Israeli state-sponsored cinema festival.

=== Phoenix Cinema Trust ===
Francis Coleman, who was prominent in the campaign to save the Phoenix, was the Trust's first Chair. The current chair is Alison Gold.

In addition to a full programme of screenings, the Trust carries on educational and community work including Kids Club (an activity for 5- to 10-year-olds, followed by a film screening); Toddler Time (an activity followed by a 30-minute screening of an animation suitable for 2- to 4-year-olds); Bringing up Baby (enabling parents and carers to enjoy the latest releases with their babies of up to a year old); Film studies programme; Cinememories (free dementia friendly screenings supported by a grant from The Mercer's Company); school screenings, holiday workshops and charity screenings.

== Cinema restoration ==
At the beginning of the Trust's ownership, there were barely funds to run the cinema. The heating was antiquated. So was the projection equipment with its carbon arcs. Programming was another challenge. Contemporary Films had won a quota system against mainstream distributors for newly released American and UK films, which meant that the Phoenix was able to "claim" every fourth or fifth one.

In 1989 the Trust enlarged the upper foyer by repositioning the stairs and creating a new entrance to the auditorium.

In 2010 there was a renovation to celebrate the cinema's centenary designed by HMDW Architects. This introduced a new café-bar with a balcony, reworked the external signage and foyer, and restored the auditorium's barrel-vaulted ceiling, and Art Deco panels.

== In popular culture ==
The Phoenix has appeared in many films, TV series and photo shoots, providing the backdrop for educational videos, fashion shoots, TV series and feature films.

Among the cinema's notable dramatic appearances were in TV comedy. In Channel 4's off-beat comedy series Black Books, the show's anti-hero came in when his new alarm system locked him out of his own shop and a hapless Jez tries to impress Zahra on a visit to The Phoenix in series 7, episode 3 of Peep Show. Another significant appearance was in the remake of the series Randall and Hopkirk, with Vic Reeves and Bob Mortimer.

Neil Jordan chose the Phoenix as an early 20th century cinema for a scene in his 1994 movie, Interview with the Vampire: The Vampire Chronicles. Jordan returned to the Phoenix to film scenes in his adaptation of Graham Greene's novel The End of the Affair. The Phoenix has also appeared in the films Nine (Rob Marshall, 2009), Nowhere Boy (Sam Taylor-Wood, 2009) and Eddie Redmayne was featured sitting in the auditorium in the film My Week with Marilyn (Simon Curtis, 2011).

It was also featured in Season 4, episode 4 of the TV series The Durrells. The cinema appears in a 2017 feature film, Films Stars Don't Die in Liverpool, starring Annette Bening and Jamie Bell, based on the book of the same name.

The Phoenix also appears in the video for the Scissor Sisters track "I Don't Feel Like Dancin'" and was recently featured in a piece directed by Samantha Morton at the Daydreaming with Stanley Kubrick exhibition at Somerset House in London.

The longest film shoot at the cinema so far was for the British comedy Mr Love, made in 1985 starring Barry Jackson. Following the adventures of a projectionist, the Phoenix was a major star of the film for which the Phoenix's chief projectionist served as a technical adviser.

== See also ==
- Gaumont Finchley, an Art Deco cinema in north Finchley (demolished 1987)
