= Apollo Victoria Theatre =

West End theatre in London

- New Victoria Cinema; New Victoria Theatre
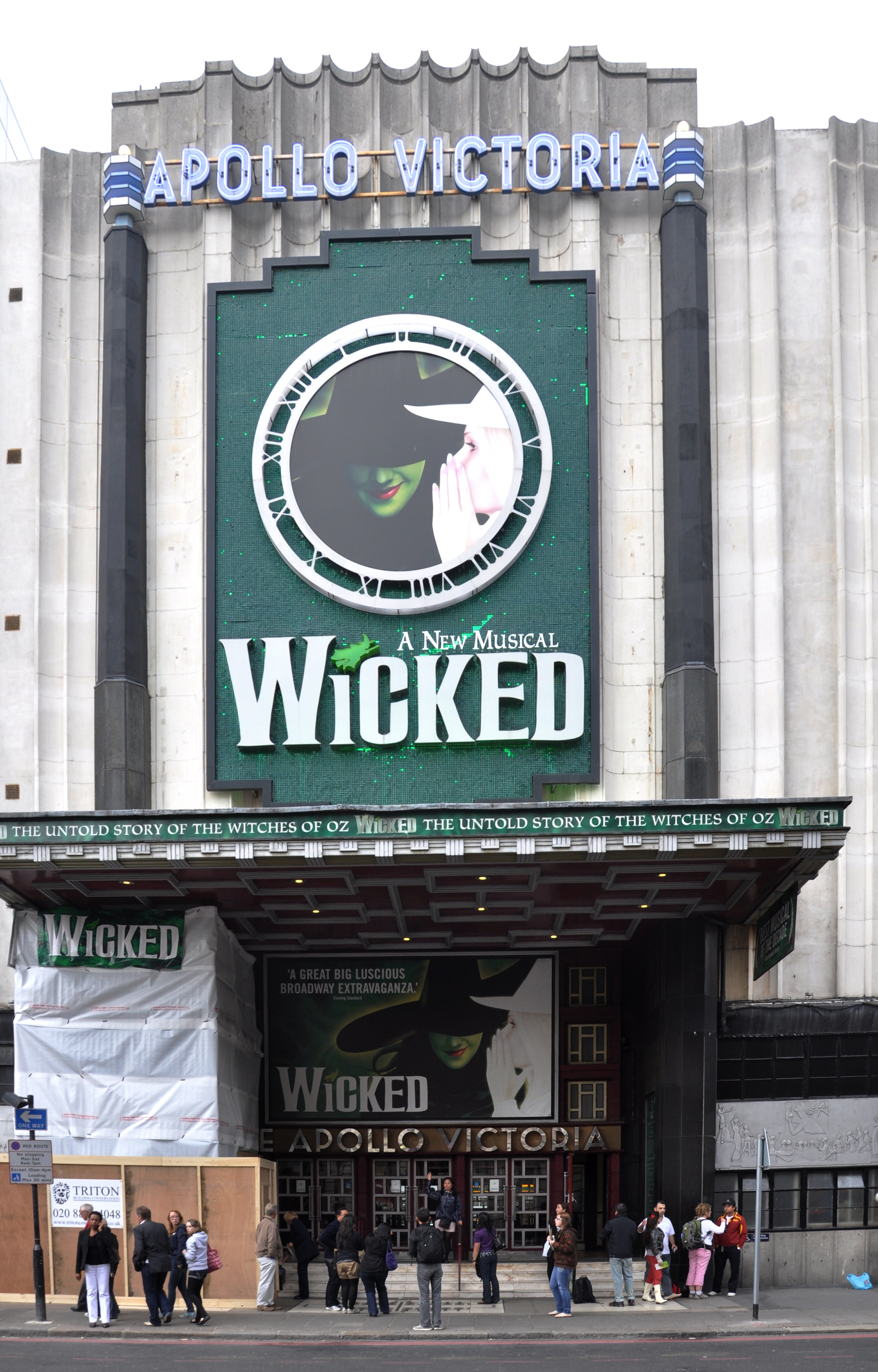
- Apollo Victoria Theatre in 2011
- Interactive map of Apollo Victoria Theatre
- Address: Wilton Road; London, SW1; United Kingdom
- Coordinates: 51.4956°N 0.1427°W
- Owner: ATG Entertainment
- Capacity: 2,328 (seated)
- Type: West End theatre
- Designation: Grade II*
- Production: Wicked
- Public transit: Victoria

Construction
- Opened: 1930 (as cinema)
- Years active: 1981–present
- Architect: E. Wamsley Lewis

Website
- www.theapollovictoria.com

The Apollo Victoria Theatre is a West End theatre on Wilton Road in the Westminster district of London, across from London Victoria Station. (The theatre also has an entrance on Vauxhall Bridge Road.) Opened in 1930 as a cinema and variety theatre, the Apollo Victoria became a venue for musical theatre, beginning with The Sound of Music in 1981, and including the long-running Starlight Express, from 1984 to 2002. The theatre is currently the home of the musical Wicked, which has played at the venue since 27 September 2006.

== History ==
=== Architecture ===
The theatre was built by architect Lewis and William Edward Trent in 1929 for Provincial Cinematograph Theatres, a part of the Gaumont British chain. The theatre was built with two identical façades on Wilton and Vauxhall Bridge Roads. Construction is principal of concrete, with strong horizontal banding along the exterior sides of the auditorium. By contrast, the entrances feature a cantilevered canopy and are framed by vertical channelling, with two black marble columns rising to the roof line. The entrance is simple, making use of chrome trimmings, this leads to a nautical themed interior in the original Art Deco style that makes extensive use of concealed lighting, decorated with scallop shells and columns that burst into sculptured fountains at the ceiling.

The theatre had a 74 feet (22.6 m) by 24 feet (7.3 m) stage and was equipped with 10 dressing rooms and two suites for principals. The theatre was Grade II* listed on 28 June 1972.

=== Cinema and variety ===
The theatre opened as the New Victoria Cinema on 15 October 1930 with a film starring George Arlis in Old English, based on a stage play by John Galsworthy. It was equipped with a Compton 3 manual 15 rank theatre organ, played on the opening night by Reginald Foort. and the theatre also staged variety shows. The first show played also during the opening was Hoop-La. Frederic Curzon was the organist from 1934 until 1938.

Variety quickly gave way to a specialisation in film performances, with occasional performances by big bands. In June 1939, the cinema was one of the three London sites chosen to present a live relay of The Epsom Derby from the pre-war BBC experimental transmissions, utilising Baird equipment to project onto a screen 15 feet by 12 (4.6 by 3.7 m) in sepia. From September 1940 to May 1941, the theatre was closed due to World War II, but no serious damage was sustained and it reopened quickly. Plans were made for demolition in the 1950s, but it was saved and presented a mixture of ballet, live shows and films. The last films were shown in November 1975, a double bill of Peter Cushing in Legend of the Werewolf (1975) and Adrienne Corri in Vampire Circus (1972), though the theatre remained open until 1976, after which it closed for five years. It was a rock concert venue from 1976 until around 1980 with acts such as ELO, Cliff Richard, Peter Gabriel, Janis Ian and many others playing there. Led Zeppelin rehearsed there, on May Day, 1980. It reopened in 1981 as the Apollo Victoria Theatre with a Shirley Bassey concert.

=== Musical theatre ===
Musicals, including The Sound of Music, Camelot and Fiddler on the Roof played at the theatre in the early 1980s. In 1984, the interior was extensively modified by the introduction of a 'race track' that ran through the audience, for the show Starlight Express with performers on roller skates. The show premièred on 27 March, composed by Andrew Lloyd Webber and directed by Trevor Nunn and ran for 7,406 performances, over 18 years. With the removal of the 'tracks', the interior was extensively restored by architects Jaques Muir and Partners. This included the removal of 3,500 incandescent lamps that had become difficult to maintain and consumed a considerable amount of power. These were replaced by 88,000 low power LEDs specially designed for the theatre, creating the first auditorium completely lit in this way. Another Lloyd Webber production followed, Bombay Dreams premièred on 19 June 2002. It was created by A. R. Rahman with lyrics by Don Black and was directed by Steven Pimlott, closing after 1,500 performances on 13 June 2004. This was followed by the return to the West End of the Bee Gee's musical Saturday Night Fever on 6 July 2004, closing 22 October 2005 to tour. This was followed on 10 April 2006 by the jukebox musical Movin' Out, featuring the music of Billy Joel. This starred James Fox but ran for only two months.

The Broadway musical Wicked received its London première at the venue on 27 September 2006 with a cast featuring Idina Menzel as Elphaba, Helen Dallimore as Glinda, Nigel Planer as The Wizard, Adam Garcia as Fiyero and Miriam Margolyes as Madame Morrible.

On 27 September 2016, Wicked celebrated its tenth anniversary in the West End, with a curtain call reunion of former cast members. On April 24, 2024, Wicked became the 10th longest-running West End show in history with its 6,762nd performance.

== Recent and present productions ==
- The Sound of Music (17 August 1981 – 18 September 1982)
- Camelot (23 November 1982 – 5 February 1983)
- Fiddler on the Roof (28 June 1983 – 29 October 1983)
- Cliff Richard performed at the theater for 33 nights between 3 November and 10 December 1983 as part of his 25th anniversary concerts on the Silver tour. Audiences totaled nearly 80,000.
- Starlight Express (27 March 1984 – 12 January 2002) by Andrew Lloyd Webber and Richard Stilgoe
- Bombay Dreams (19 June 2002 – 13 June 2004) by A. R. Rahman, Don Black and Meera Syal
- Saturday Night Fever (2 July 2004 – 18 February 2006) by The Bee Gees and Nan Knighton
- Movin' Out (28 March 2006 – 22 May 2006) by Twyla Tharp and Billy Joel
- Wicked (27 September 2006 – Present), by Stephen Schwartz and Winnie Holzman

== See also ==
- Gaumont Finchley, another cinema designed by W. E. Trent.
