= Gaumont Palace =

Gaumont Palace may refer to a number of venues including:

- The Gaumont-Palace, a cinema in Paris open from 1907 to 1973
- The cinema behind John Halle's Hall in Salisbury, opened in 1931, and known by this name from 1931 to 1937, when it became the Gaumont Theatre
- The Hammersmith Apollo in London was known by this name from 1932 to 1962
