= John Halle's Hall =

Grade I listed late medieval building in Salisbury, United Kingdom

Coordinates: 51°04′06″N 1°47′41″W

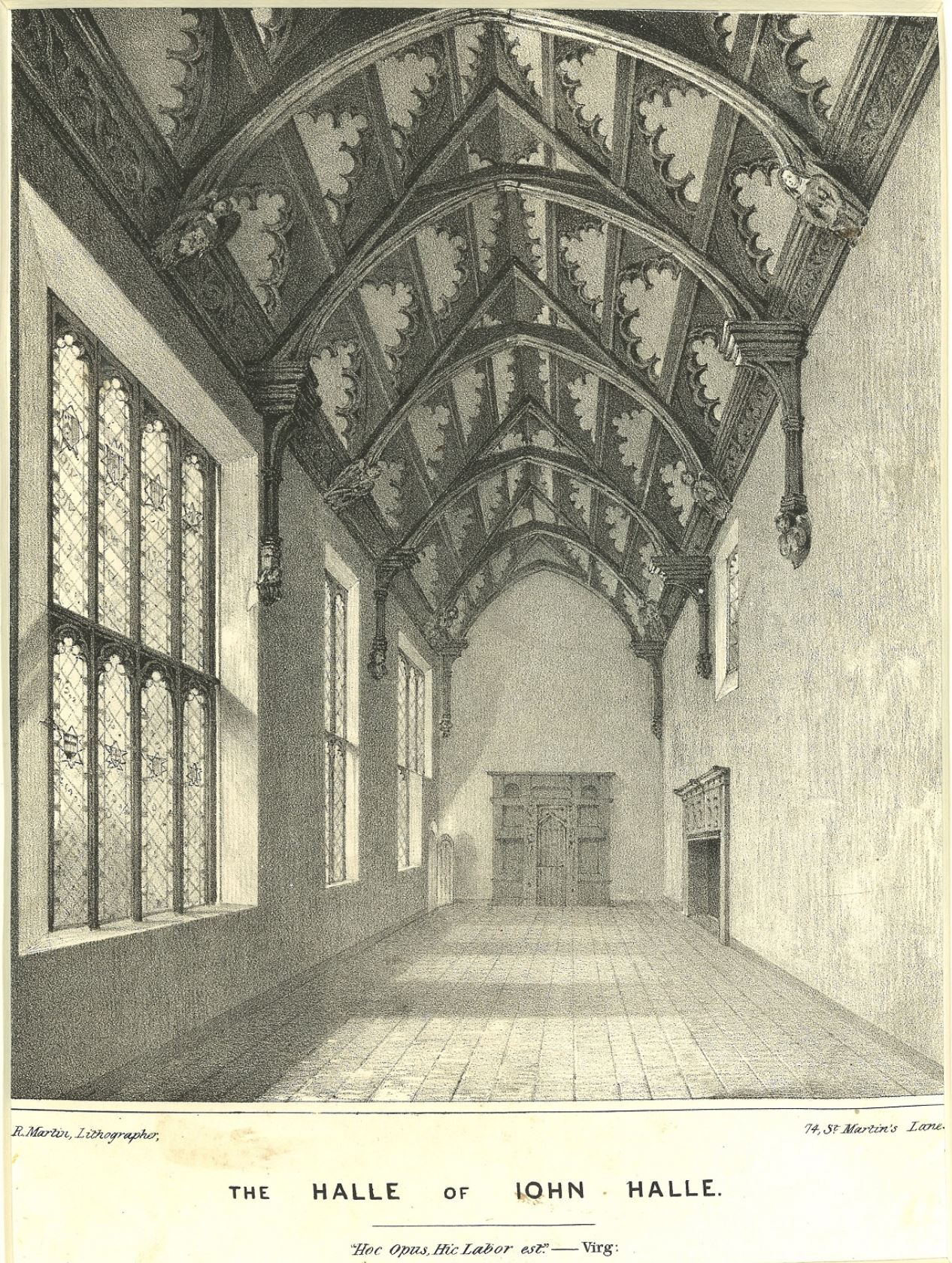
Lithograph of the interior of John Halle's Hall by Robert Martin (fl. 1770s–1838), looking south, showing the Hall following the 1834 restoration work which removed the post-medieval and modern internal apartment divisions.

John Halle's Hall is a 15th-century late medieval building, a hall house, in Salisbury, England, with later 16th-, 19th- and 20th-century additions. The Hall is a Grade I listed building, the top category, 'of highest significance'. The medieval part of the building is now the foyer of a cinema, with a Victorian mock-Tudor street façade added in 1880–1881, together with the main cinema screening room built in 1931 behind the foyer. Architectural historian Sir Nikolaus Pevsner described this conglomeration as ' ... a great curiosity, a cinema with a grossly overdone timber-framed Tudor façade ..., and behind this façade the substantial and memorable remains of the House of John Hall'.

== Early history ==
John Halle was a wealthy and influential Salisbury wool merchant. He was possibly the son of Thomas Halle, who was a member of the Salisbury Corporation from 1436 to 1440. John Halle is recorded as being a member of the Salisbury Common Council in 1446. In 1448 he became an Alderman, and in 1449 Constable of New Street Ward. He was repeatedly elected Mayor of Salisbury, first in 1451, then in 1458, 1460, 1461 and 1465. He died on 18 October 1479.

John Halle's Hall stands in the centre of Salisbury on the south side of the road known as New Canal, a little distance south of the central market place. In 1455 he already owned property on the Ditch (New Canal) and in Carternstrete (Catherine Street) to the east. Halle bought the plot of land on which his hall house stands in 1467, and it was built over the period 1470–1483.

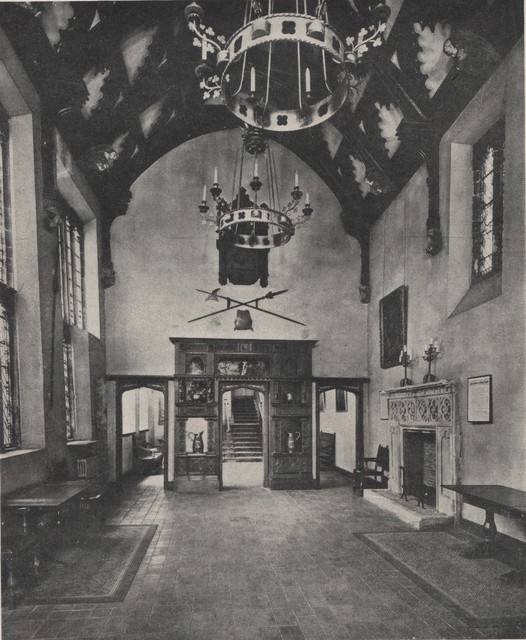
Interior of John Halle's Hall, looking south. The three doorways are not original medieval ones, but later additions. Photographed in 1935, when the hall was the foyer of the newly built Gaumont Palace cinema.

== Architectural details of the Hall ==
The Hall is a Grade I listed building, the top category, 'of highest significance'. The surviving ground-floor parts of the 15th- and 16th-century building that are open to the public comprise three rooms. From north to south, they are a small room with a "minstrels' gallery", which now serves as the cinema entrance lobby with ticket office; the main hall; and a small lower-ceilinged inner room beyond.

=== Entrance room with gallery ===
In the 16th century a three-storeyed timber-framed building was added on to the north end of the Hall, on the street now known as New Canal, and has been much altered since. The entrance lobby from the street is two storeys high, with an open gallery with flat cut-out balusters along the south wall at first-floor level. The ceiling is heavily beamed. The wooden structure has been restored, possibly in the 17th century. The third storey has two original west windows. The archway at the south end of the entrance room leading into the Hall is from the restorations of 1834.

=== The Hall ===
The 15th-century Hall is in "fairly original state". It is two storeys high, with a "splendid" six-bayed open timber roof, with an elaborate arrangement of collar-beams, arched braces, purlins and "delightfully cusped" wind braces. Carved human figure and angel head brackets support the braces and collar-beams. On the east wall there are two large four-light windows and one two-light window; the former window at the south of the Hall has two lower lights omitted to allow the arched door to be inserted as part of the original design. The window at a high level on the west wall is a small two-light window, of 15th-century origin but unlikely to be in its original position. The windows contain much original stained glass, including heraldic insignia and John Halle's merchant's mark. On the east wall is a "splendid" stone fireplace with a frieze of quatrefoils, one of which bears John Halle's merchant's mark. It has been suggested that, although 15th-century in date and bearing Halle's merchant's mark, this fireplace might not be in its original location, as the Hall would have had an open hearth. It is suggested that it may not be in situ and may have come from one of the chambers in the building. In the 19th century this fireplace was used as a model by Augustus Pugin for some of his architectural designs. The archway at the north end of the Hall and the central doorway at the southern end are from 1834; and the two flanking doorways at the south end of the Hall are modern (from the 1930–1931 cinema alterations). On the exterior, the Hall is ashlar-faced on the east side, and built of brick and flint on the west side. The roof has terracotta tiles.

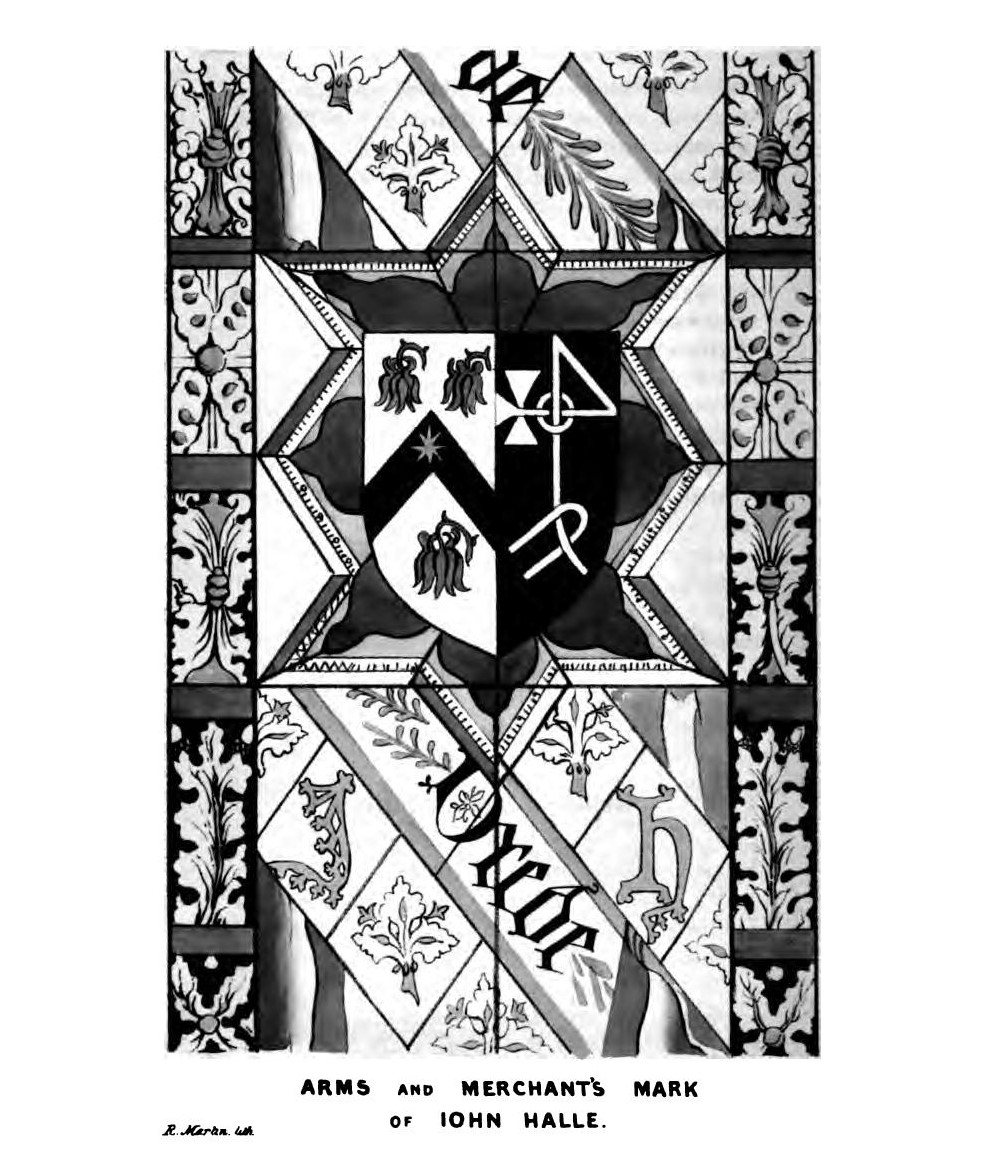
Lithograph of arms (left) and merchant's mark (right) of John Halle, in a stained glass window at John Halle's Hall, window in east wall.

=== Small inner room ===
This two-storey part of the building also dates from the 15th century. The ground-floor room is only one storey high, and has a ceiling with very heavily moulded beams (considered by the RCHM as re-set). It has two windows on the east wall, described as the RCHM as modern. Steps lead up from this room into the 1930s cinema. The room above it "contains nothing notable".

== Historic England listing details ==
"C15 with 1881 imitation timber front, elaborate framework, 3 storeys gabled, ornate carved bargeboards and finial. 8 light lattice casements to both floors, pargetting to side panels, carved beam ends to overhangs. Cinema entrance on ground floor. The remains of the Hall consist of an outer lobby 2 storeys high (the present Cinema entrance lobby) of timber framed structure restored, with an open gallery at 1st floor level and heavily beamed ceiling over 1st floor, this leads into the Hall which is in a fairly original state, of 2 storeys with open timber roof with elaborate cusped bracing pattern to purlins supported on moulded pointed arched beams. The east wall has original tall stone mullioned windows with modern lead lights with one smaller similar window on west wall. From this Hall 2 doors lead into a lower inner room with a heavy moulded beamed ceiling. The exterior of the east front is of ashlar stone with 2 moulded stone mullioned windows with pointed arched cusped heads to light set in rectangular frame of coved moulding, with small arched door to left hand of similar design, with trefoil spandrel ornament. The west side of the Hall is of brick and flint and one small stone mullioned window to left hand with pointed cusped heads to lights. Old tile roof to Hall."

== Pevsner description ==
"The principal survival is the hall, with a splendid open roof of six bays. Arched braces on figure brackets carry the collar-beams. The braces form pointed arches. Four tiers of delightfully cusped wind-braces also forming pointed arches. The hall is ashlar-faced. It has to the W only one small two-light window but to the E two large, straight-headed transomed four-light windows and one transomed two-light window. The lights are arched and cusped at the top as well as below the transoms. The small doorway cuts into the southern of the four-light windows, giving it an oddly limping shape. So on that side was the screens passage. Yet the room to the S of the hall has a ceiling with heavily moulded beams (probably re-set: RCHM). The room to the N, the entrance hall of the cinema, must have been remodelled in the C17. It has a gallery round with flat cut-out balusters. Splendid stone fireplace with a frieze of quatrefoils in the hall. A good deal of original stained glass, shields-of-arms and scrollwork, well restored and supplemented by Willement (Dean Woodforde)."

== Later history ==
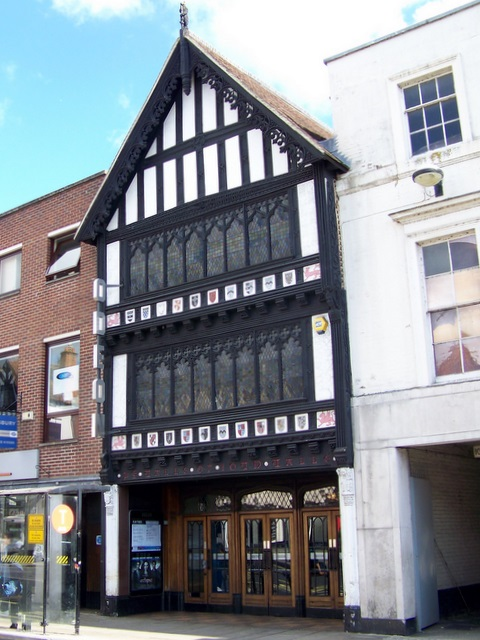
The 1880–1881 mock Tudor north façade of John Halle's Hall, leading into the Odeon Cinema. New Canal, Salisbury. Photographed in 2010.

In 1669 the Hall was being used as a tavern, as described by the antiquary John Aubrey: "His dwelling house, now a taverne (1669), was on the Ditch, where in the glasse windowes are many scutchions of his armes yet remaining, and severall merchant markes." The street was built along "the ditch", also known as "the canal", one of Salisbury's main watercourses. The name New Canal for the street was in use by 1751." The watercourse has long-since been culverted and infilled.

From 1816–1819 the Hall was used as part of the printing offices of The Wiltshire Gazette.

Before its restoration in 1834, the Hall had been "divided and sub-divided into many small upper and lower rooms".

The building was restored by Augustus Pugin in 1834, one of his very first architectural commissions, and F.R. Fisher, clerk of works for Salisbury Cathedral, for Mr Sampson Payne, the client, a glass and china merchant. A book published the same year, Peter Hall's Picturesque Memorials of Salisbury, stated "..the restoration of this splendid and interesting room, which is now entirely choked with modern apartments, is the result of most careful survey and measurement, without any alteration whatever, beyond the removal of temporary and incongruous obstructions."

Another source states Pugin's work also involved the insertion of an oak screen with a single, central doorway at the southern end of the Hall, made from an old cabinet with carved figures, and that above this was a painting of an angel with a scroll and royal arms, executed by Pugin in eight hours without break. The painting survives, and bears the text 'This hall Built 1470 Restored 1834'.

An 1841 article mentions that "the hall...has been recently cleared of the modern apartments by which it was choked, and completely restored with the greatest taste and judgment under the direction of Mr. Fisher, clerk of works to the cathedral. It is now the chief show-room of a china warehouse and is not a little set off by its gay and glittering contents." For this joint project Pugin was the architect/commissionee, and Fisher as the clerk of works directing the workmen.

The window glass was "extensively restored" by John Beare in 1834, as part of Pugin's project. Pevsner states the stained glass was restored and augmented by the noted stained glass artist Thomas Willement (1786–1861).

In 1880–1881 the mock Tudor three-storey north (street) façade was added, designed by Salisbury-based architect Fred Ward, and commissioned by the owners, china merchants Mr Watson and Mr Godden. The noted architectural historian Sir Nikolaus Pevsner was not a fan, describing the façade as "grossly overdone". An April 1881 newspaper account of the work noted that, before undertaking the new façade, "Messrs Watson and Godden, ... with praiseworthy spirit, first rebuilt the back portion of the premises." In around 1910 the Hall is shown in a photograph with the ground-floor shop front of Watson & Co.

=== Cinema and music venue ===
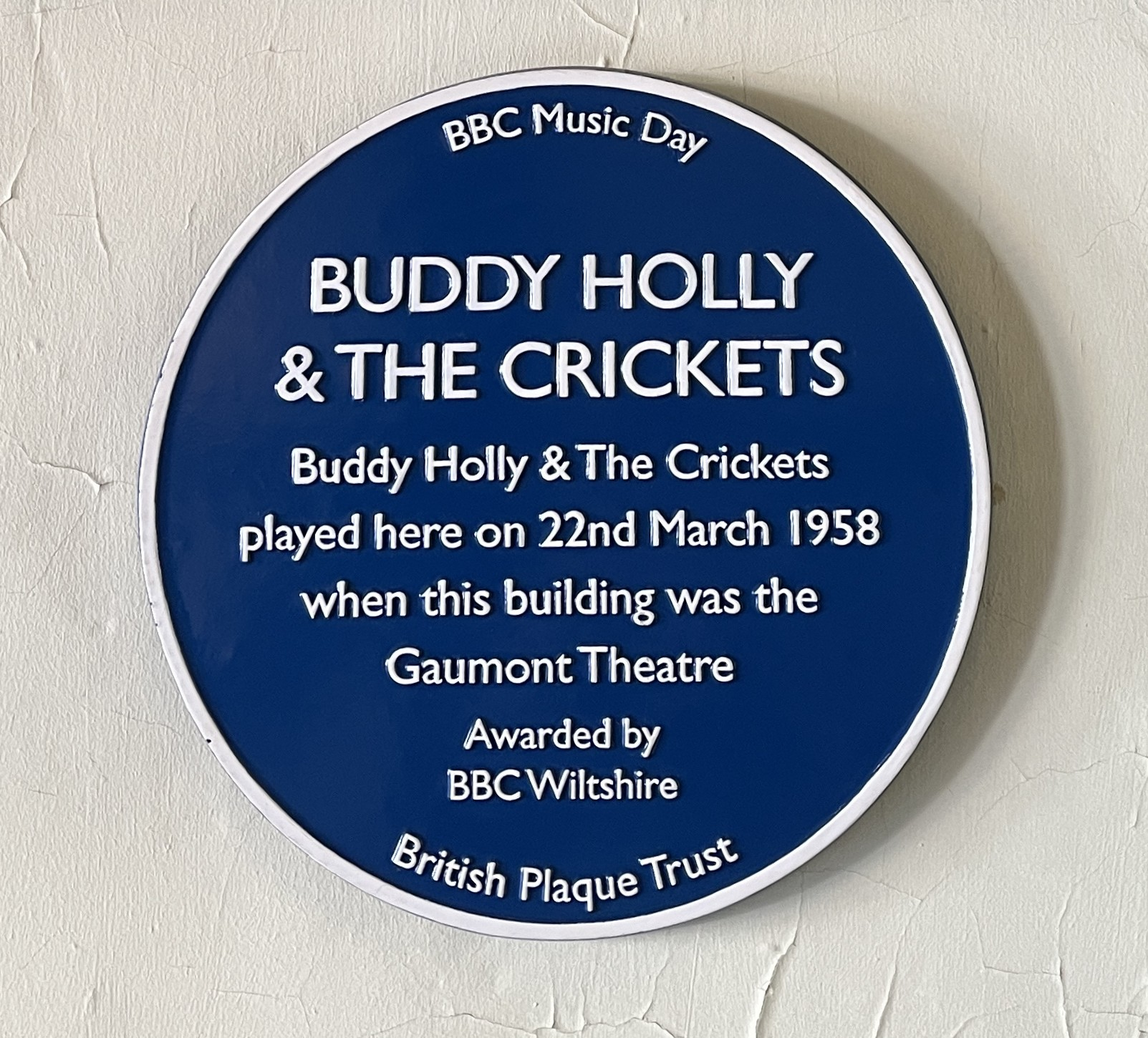
Plaque commemorating the three concerts played by Buddy Holly and the Crickets on Saturday 22 March 1958.

In the early 1930s the Hall was converted into the foyer of the Gaumont Palace cinema, for which a new 1,687-seat theatre was built in less than eighteen months on land behind the Hall. The theatre was built with a Tudor theme, to match the splendid medieval foyer area, and opened on 7 September 1931. The project's architect was William Edward Trent. The cinema was renamed the Gaumont Theatre in 1937, and changed to the Odeon by the Rank Organisation in August 1964.

The Gaumont Theatre hosted live music shows as well as showing films. On Saturday 22 March 1958, Buddy Holly with his band the Crickets played three concerts in the main theatre. A plaque commemorating their visit is on the east wall of the entrance hall. Other acts who played at the Gaumont included The Everly Brothers, Adam Faith and Cilla Black.

The 1930–1931 cinema building is listed Grade II by Historic England.

== Gallery ==
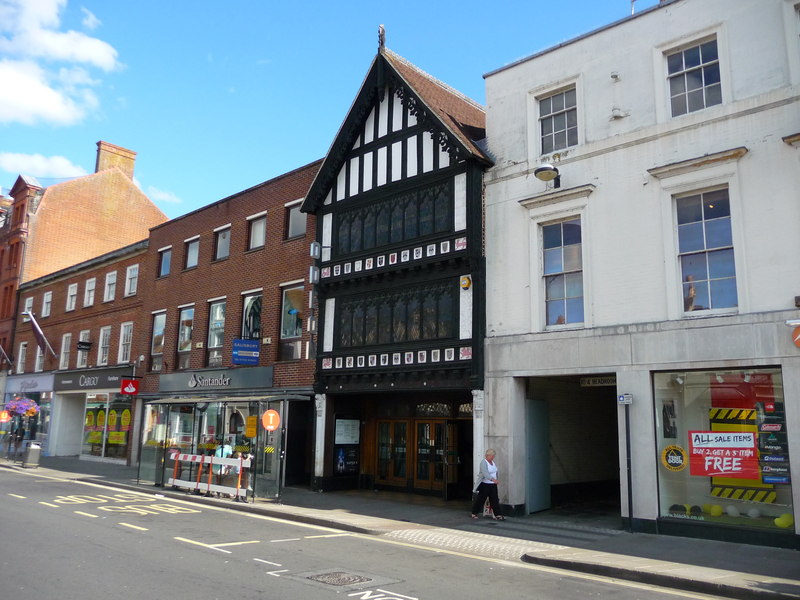
The 1880–1881 mock-Tudor north façade of John Halle's Hall, leading into the Odeon Cinema, Salisbury.

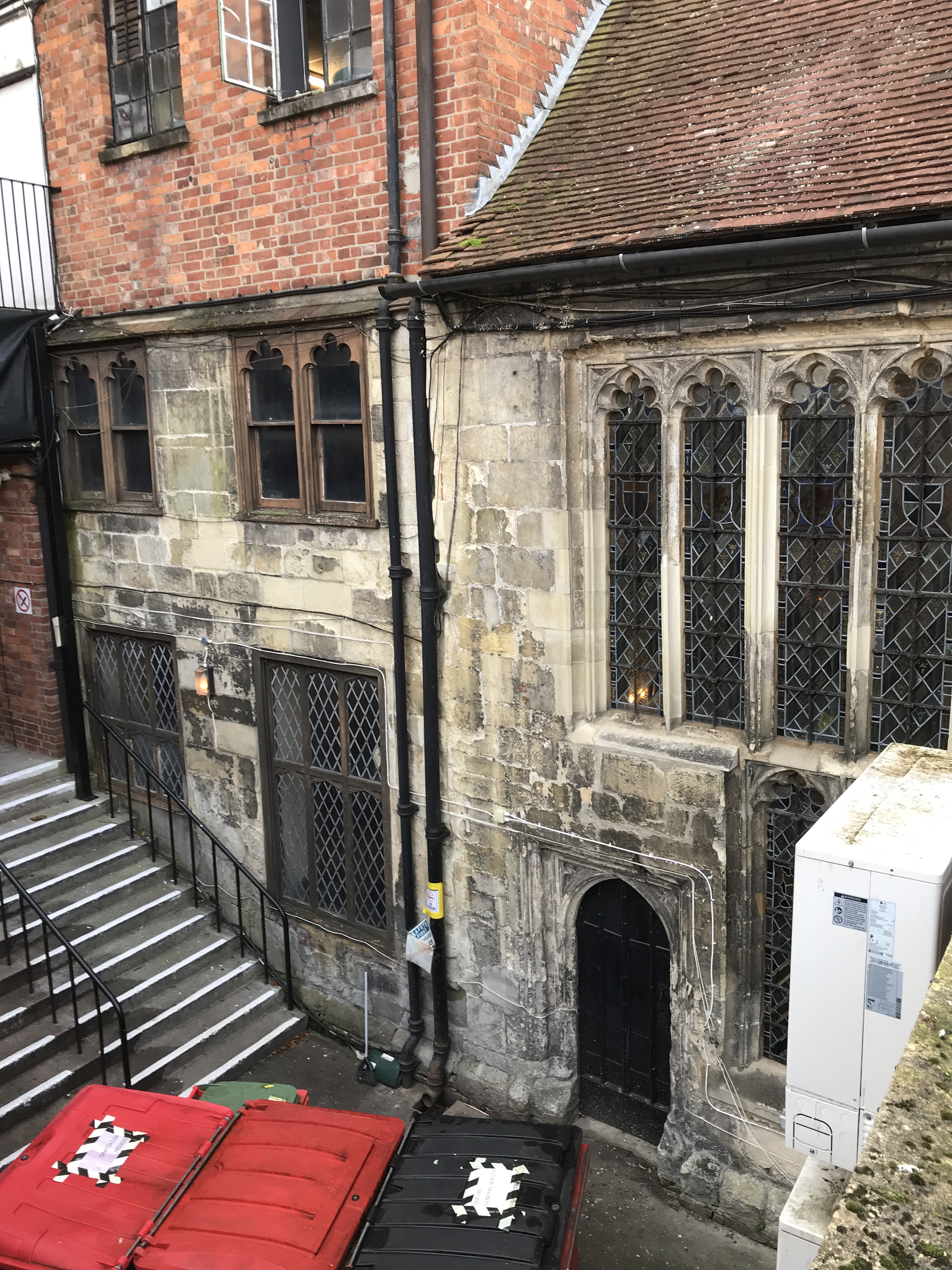
East façade.

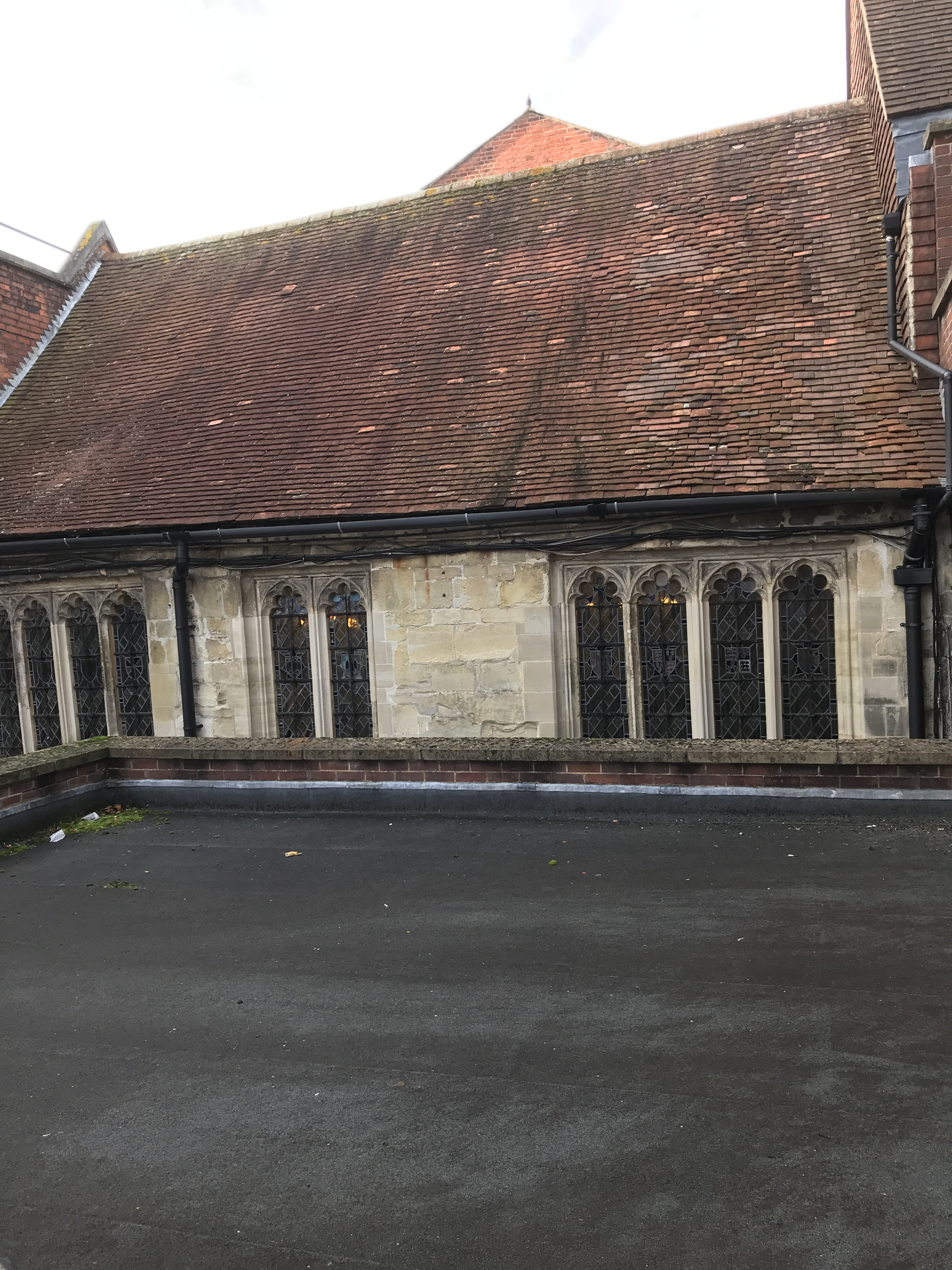
East façade.

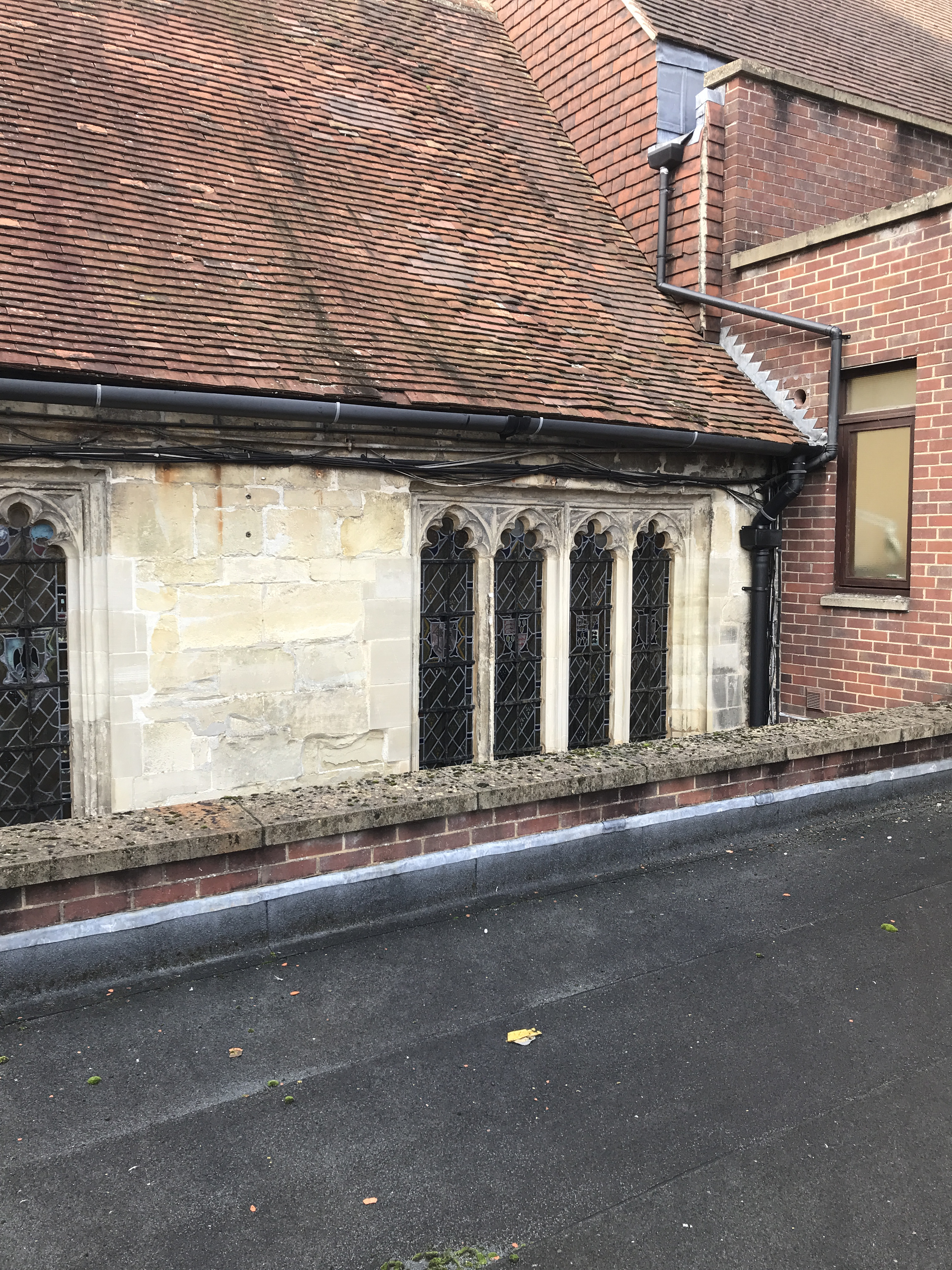
East façade.

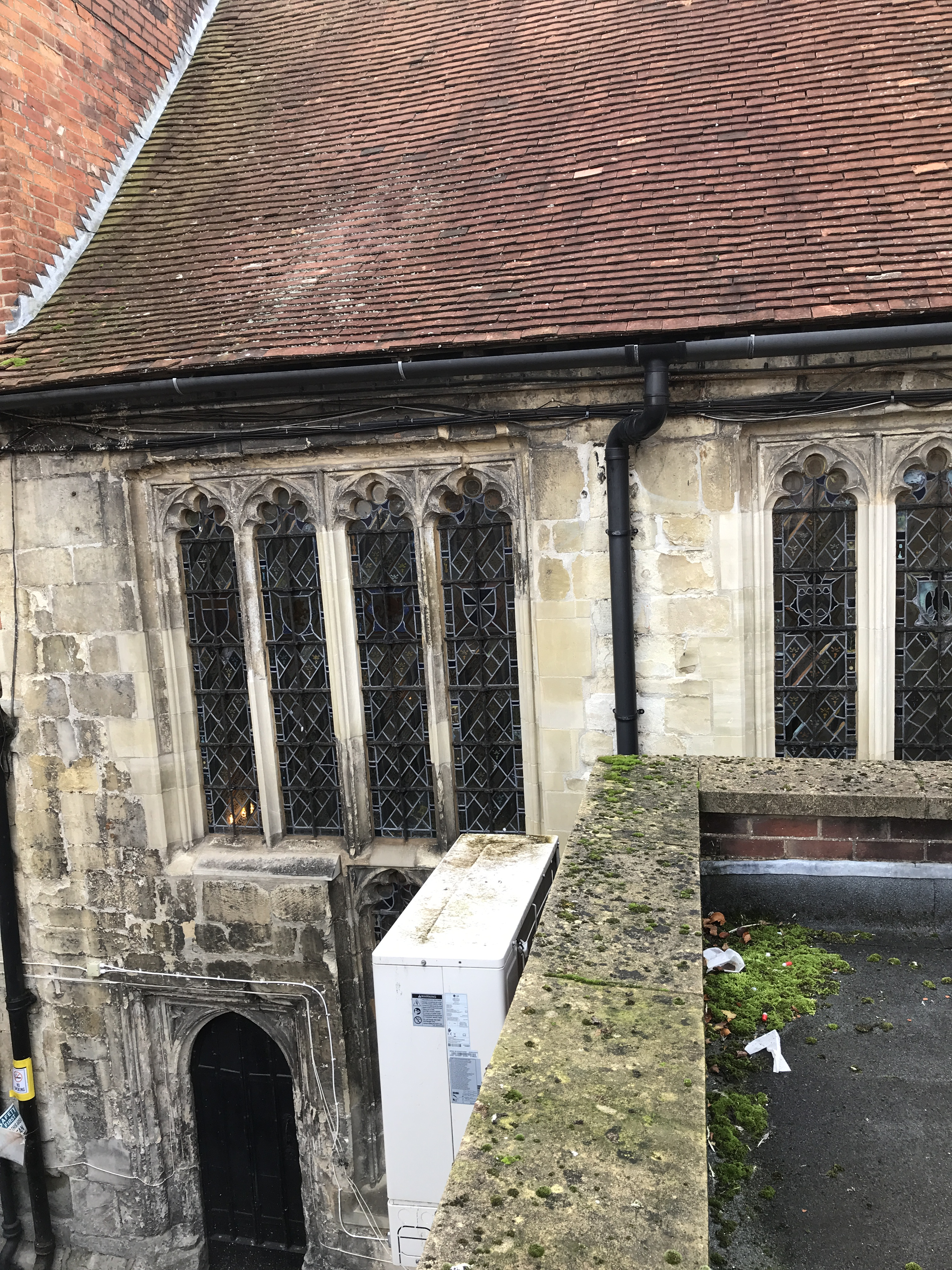
East façade.

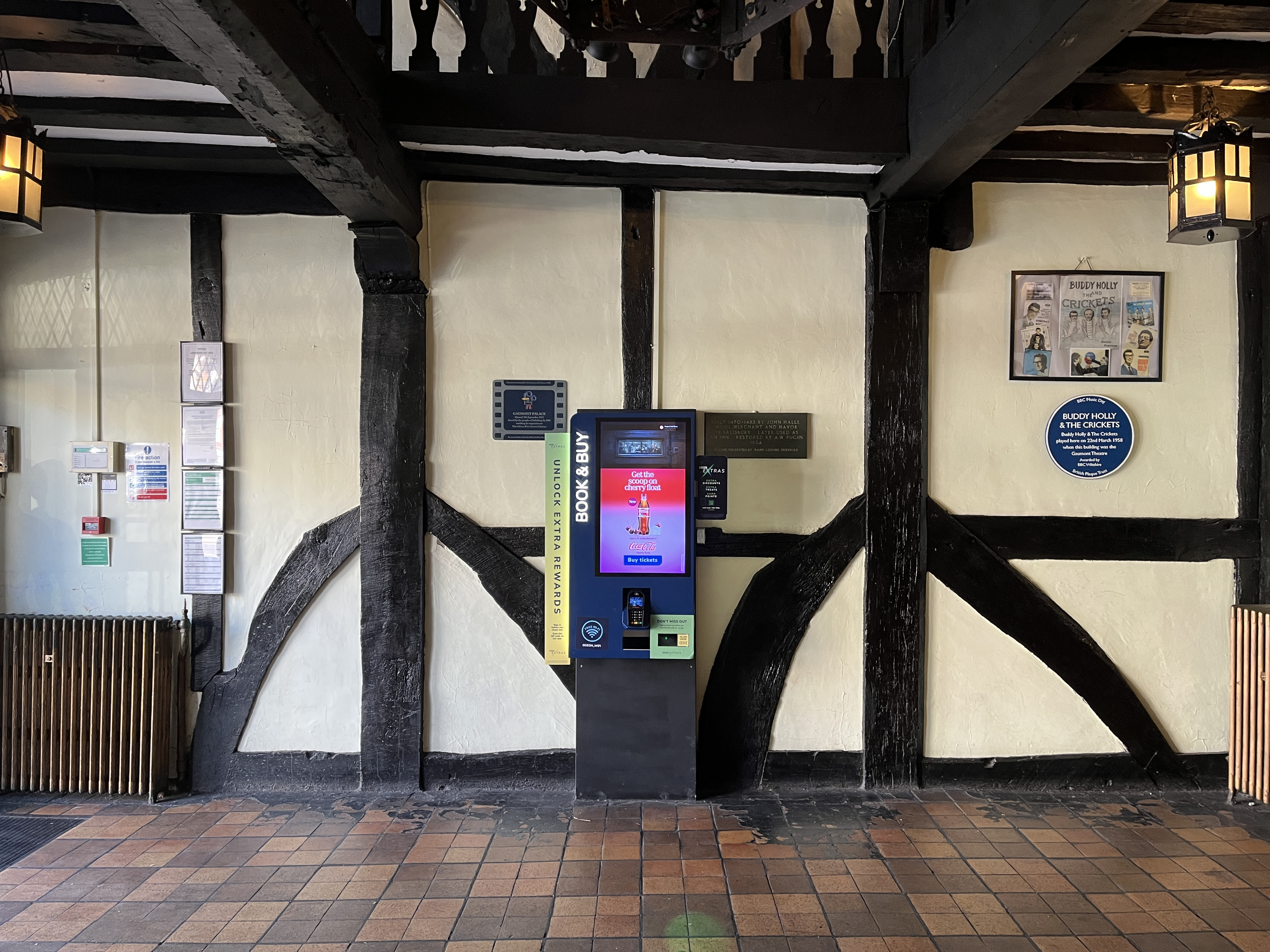
16th-century entrance room with gallery, east wall. The plaque commemorates a concert by Buddy Holly and the Crickets in 1958.

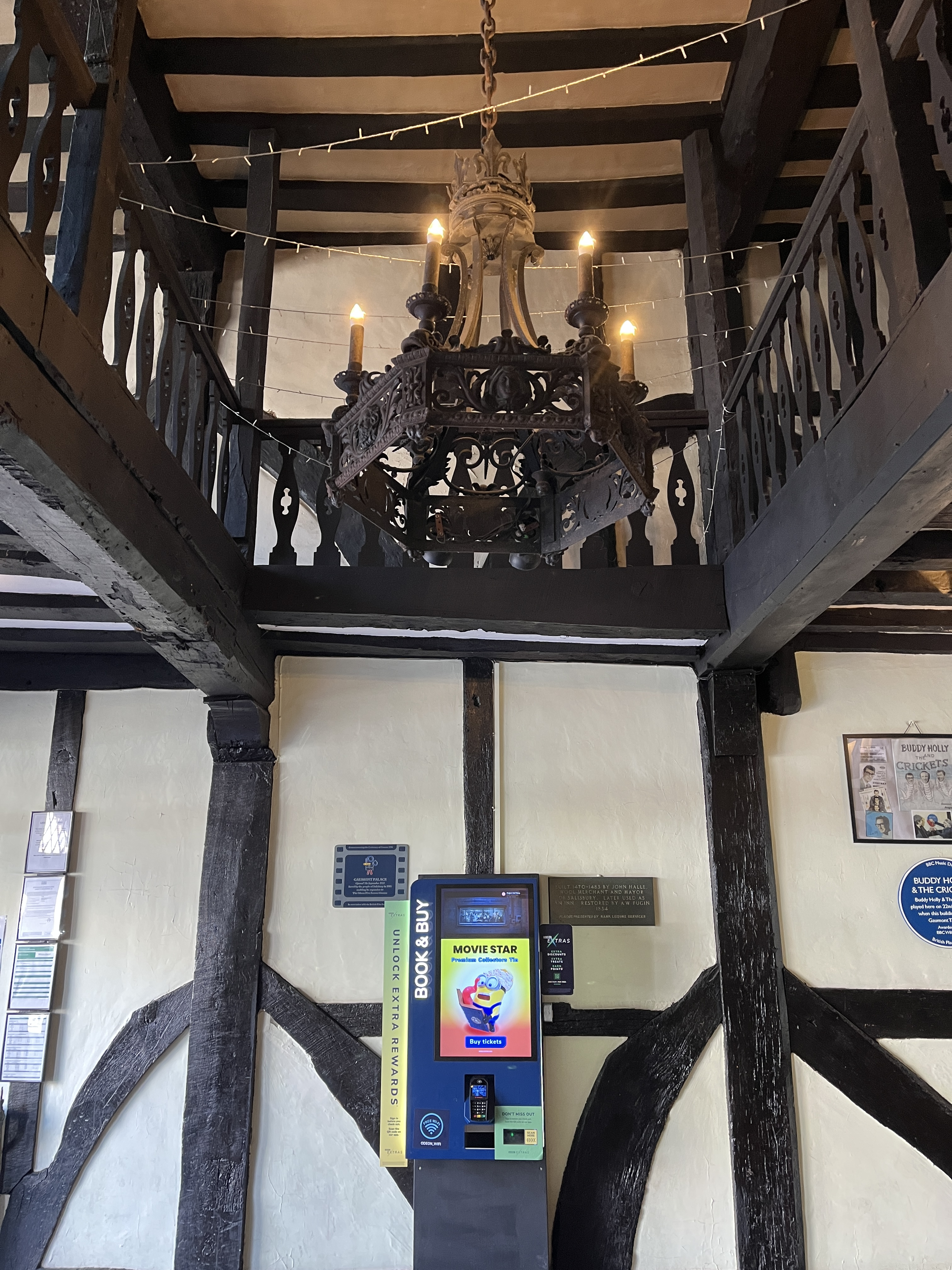
16th-century entrance room with gallery, east wall. The plaque commemorates a concert by Buddy Holly and the Crickets in 1958.

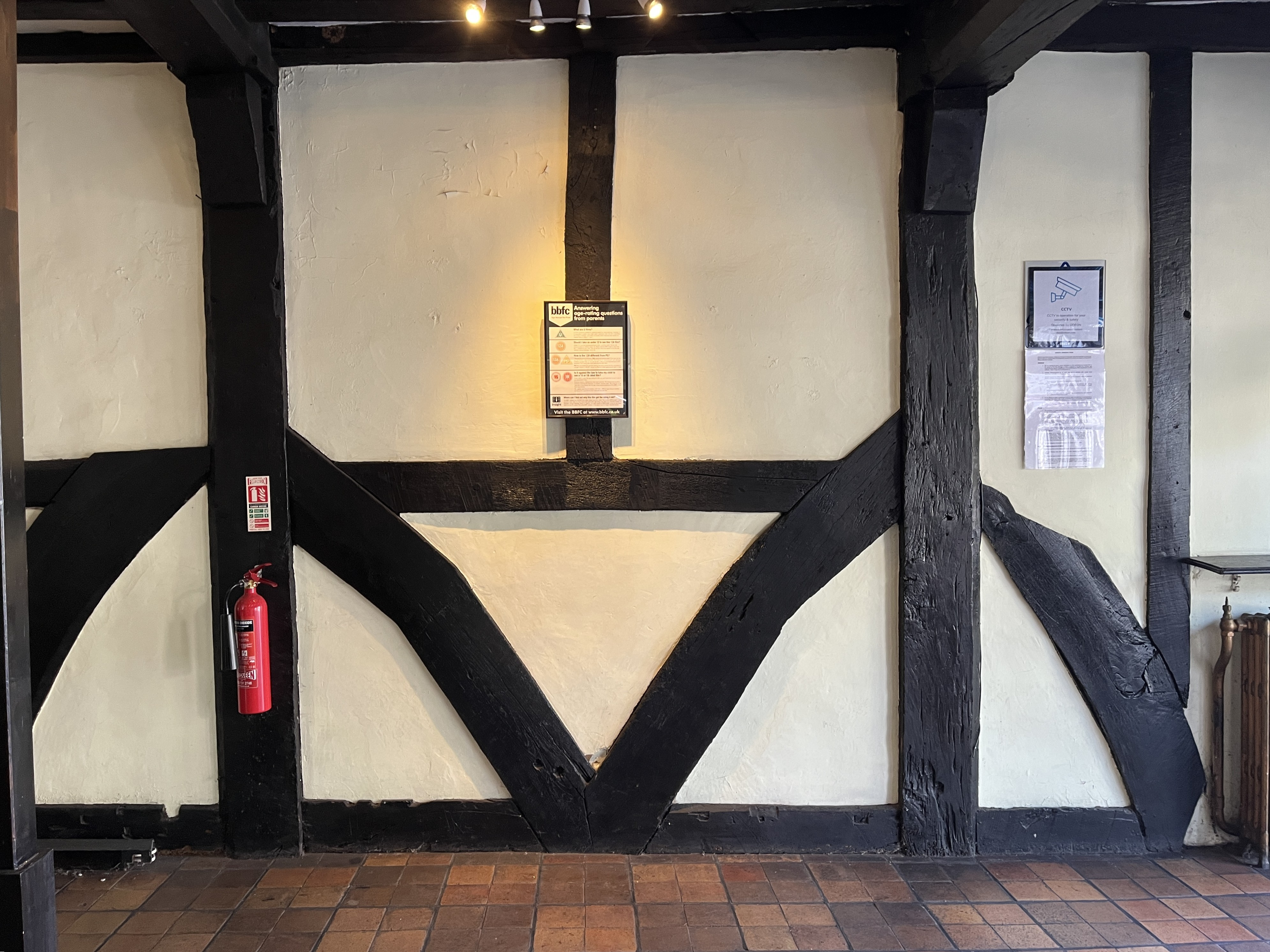
16th-century entrance room with gallery, west wall.

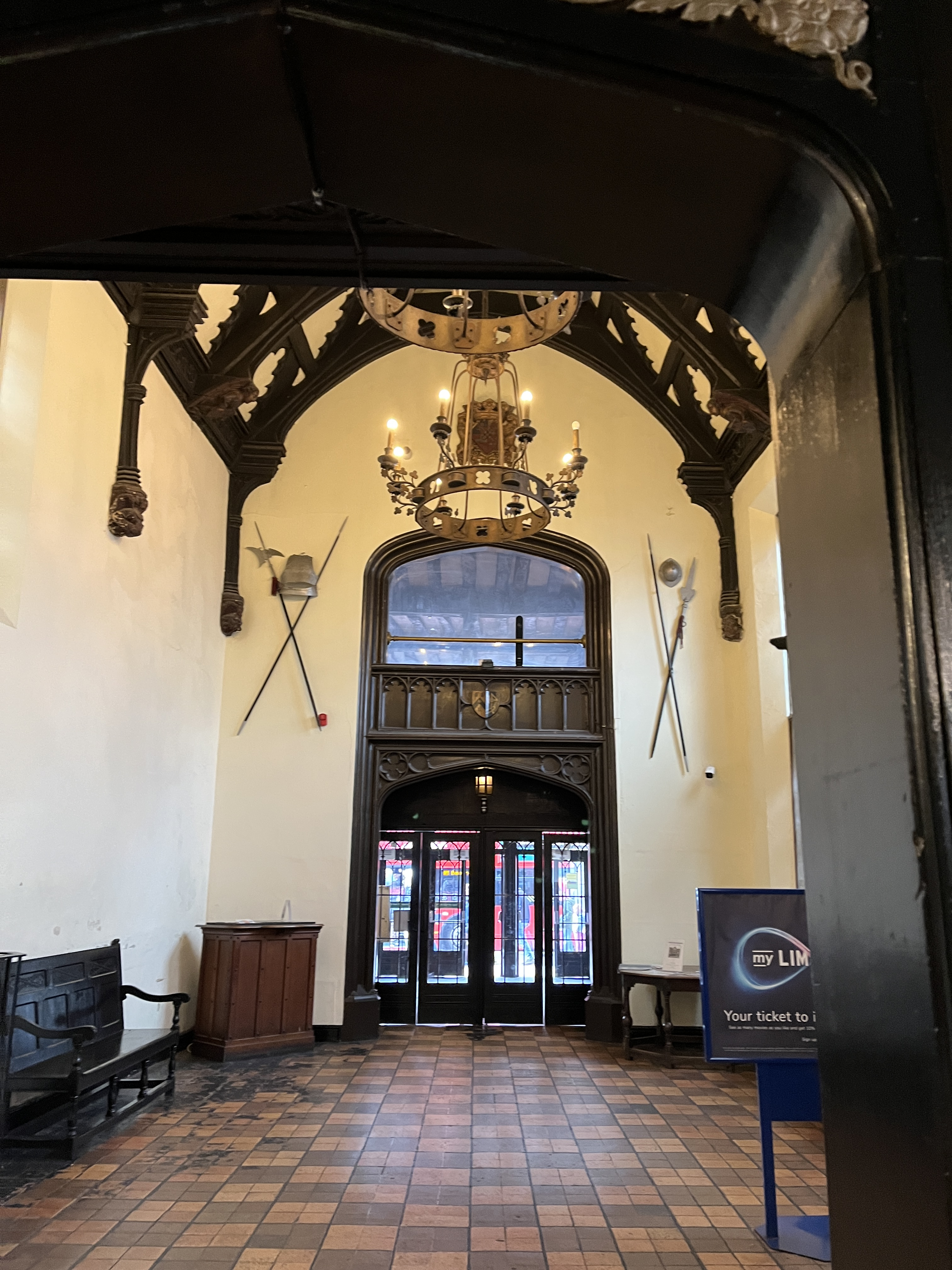
The 15th-century Hall: looking north towards the street (New Canal).

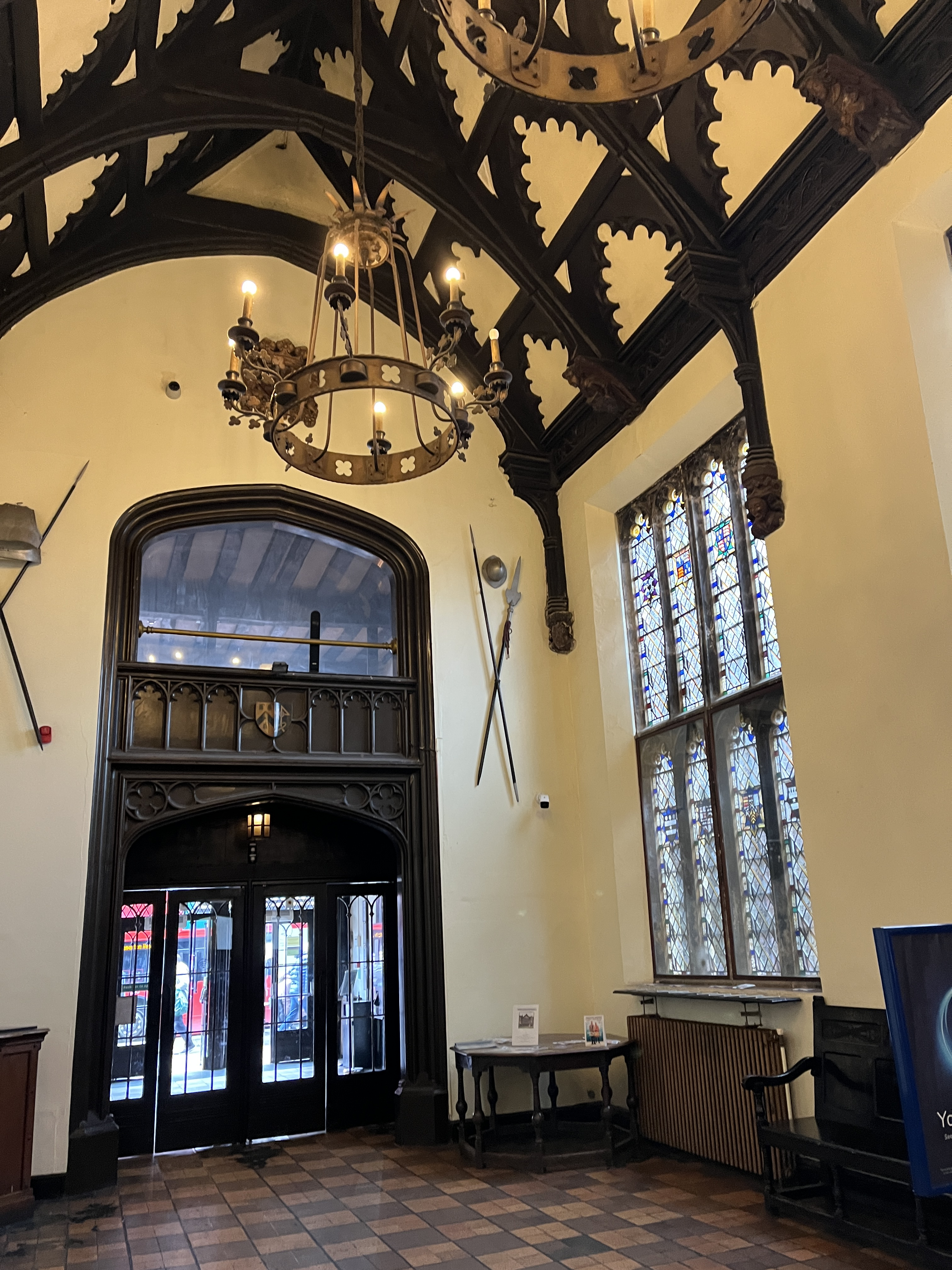
The 15th-century Hall: looking north towards the street (New Canal).

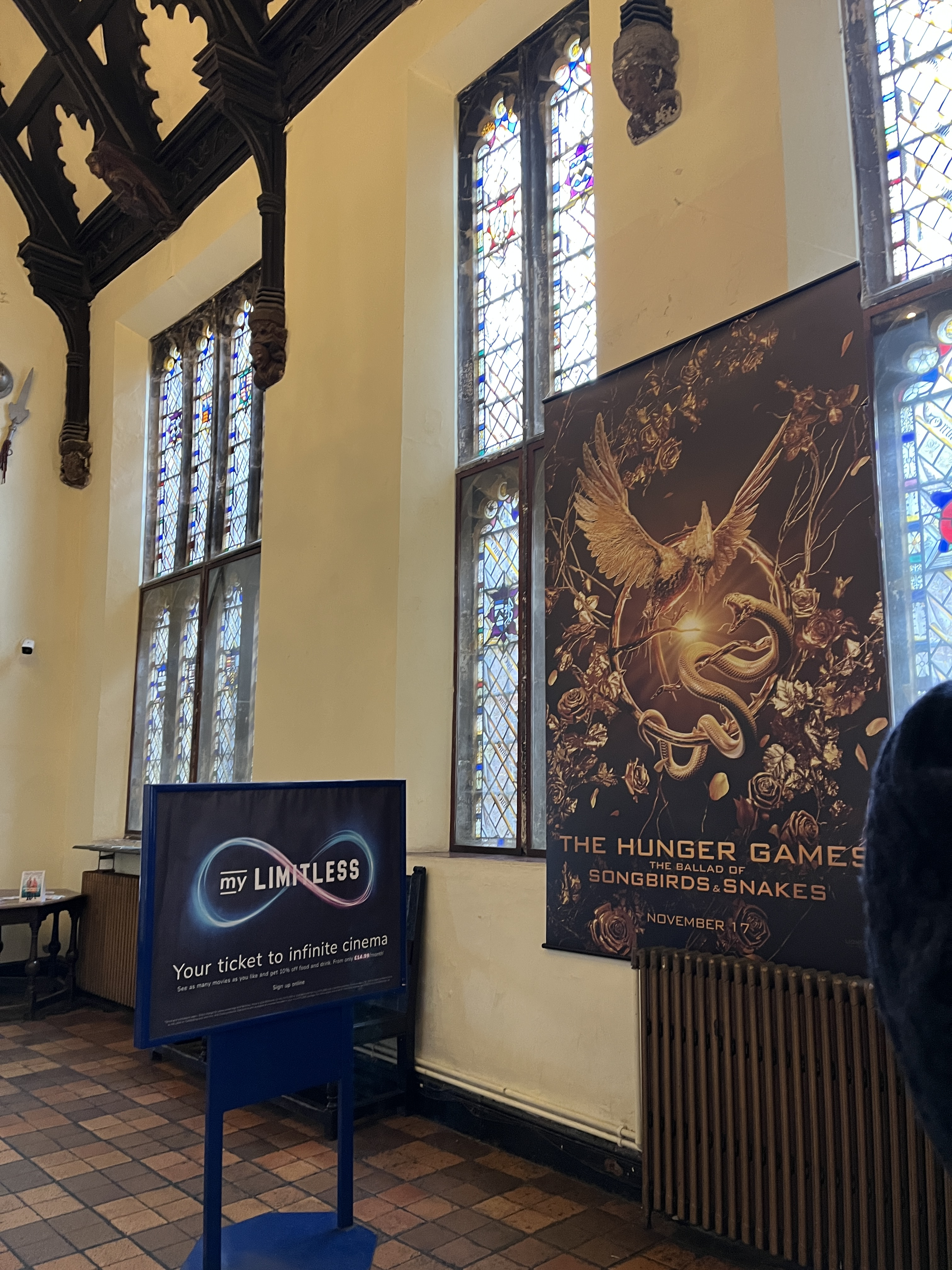
The 15th-century Hall: stained glass windows on east wall.

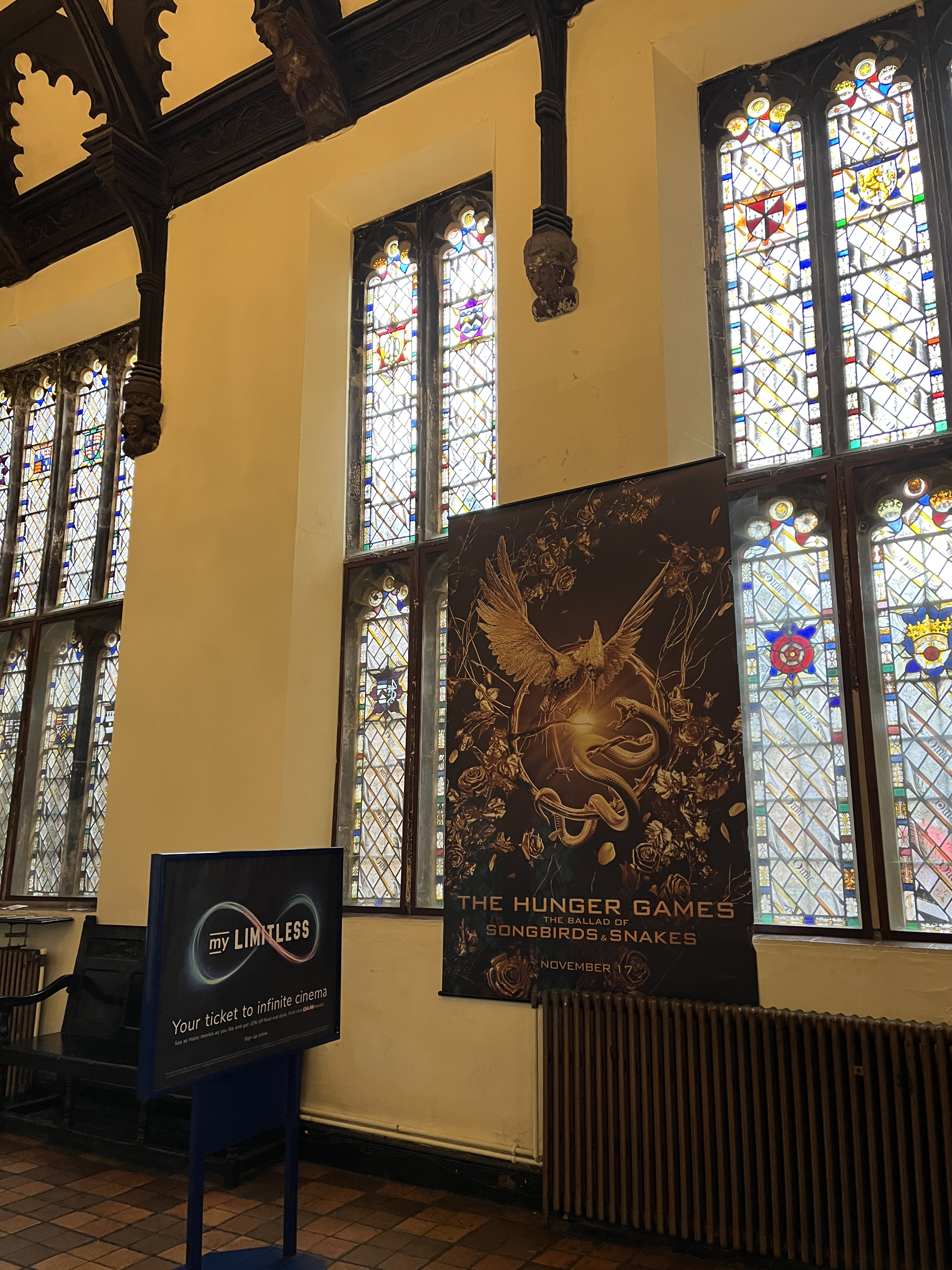
The 15th-century Hall: stained glass windows on east wall.

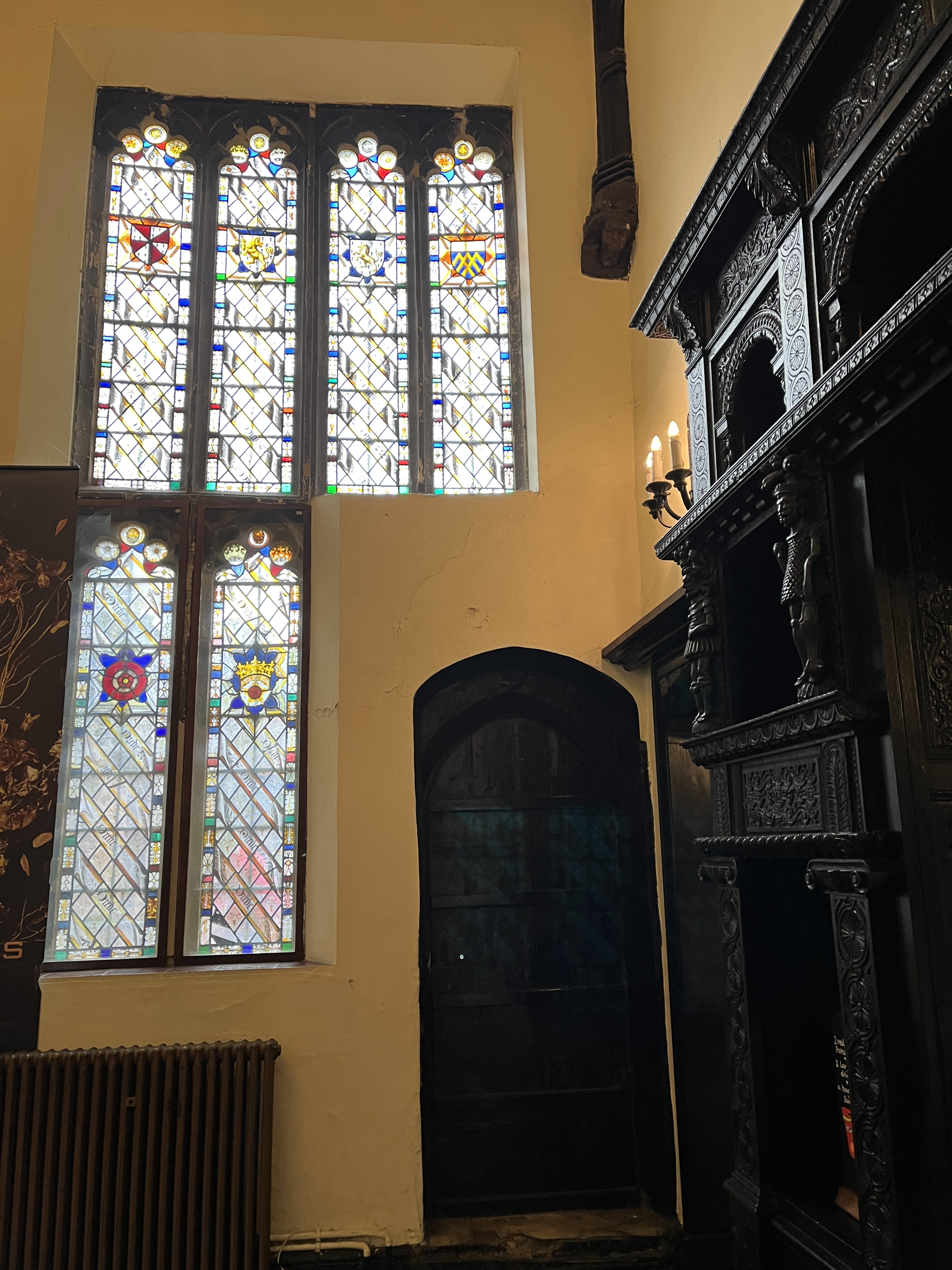
The 15th-century Hall: stained glass windows on east wall above the door and south end of hall.

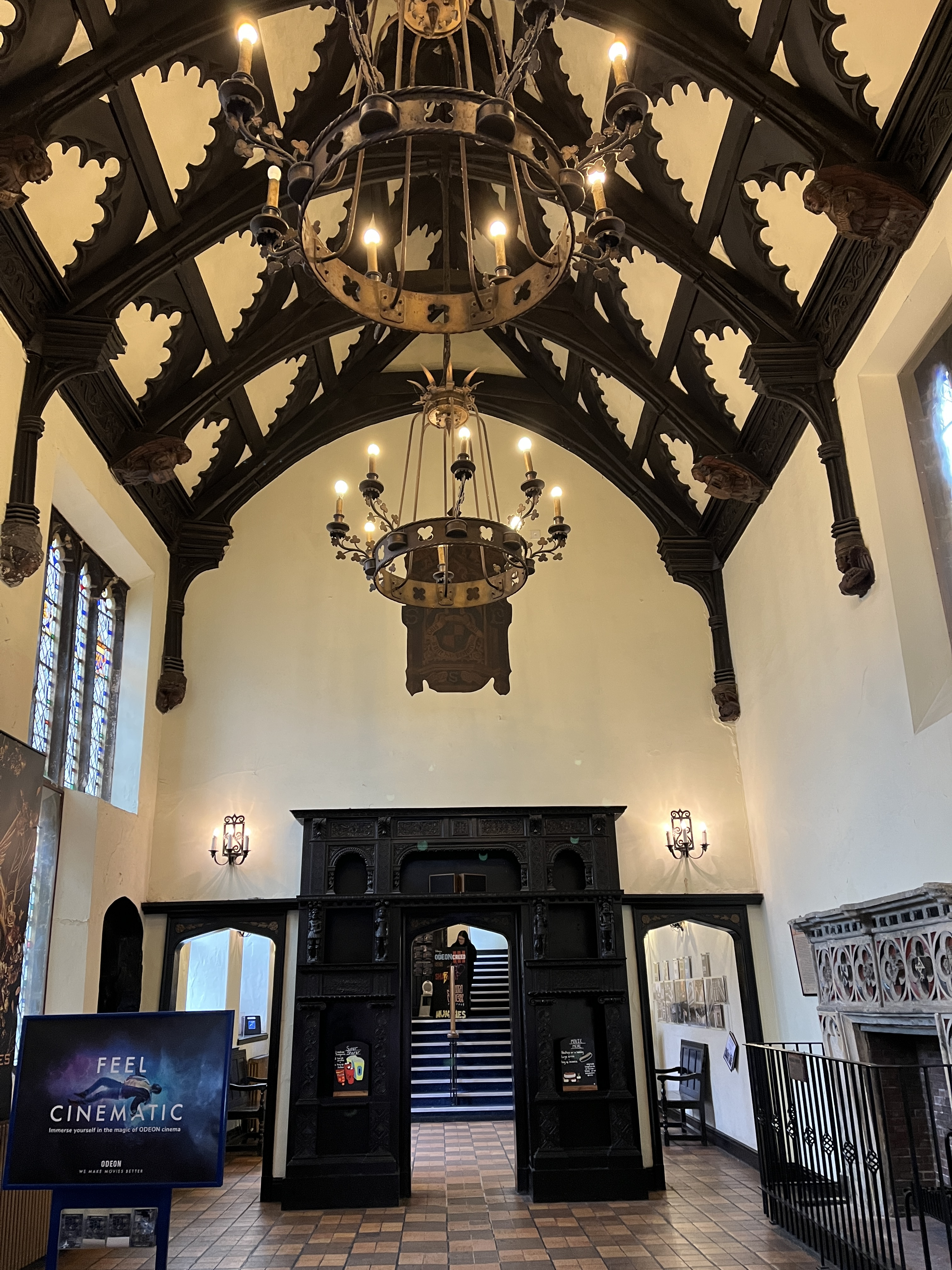
Looking to the south end of the 15th-century Hall and through to the small inner room beyond. The screen was inserted by Augustus Pugin, who also painted the plaque above it.

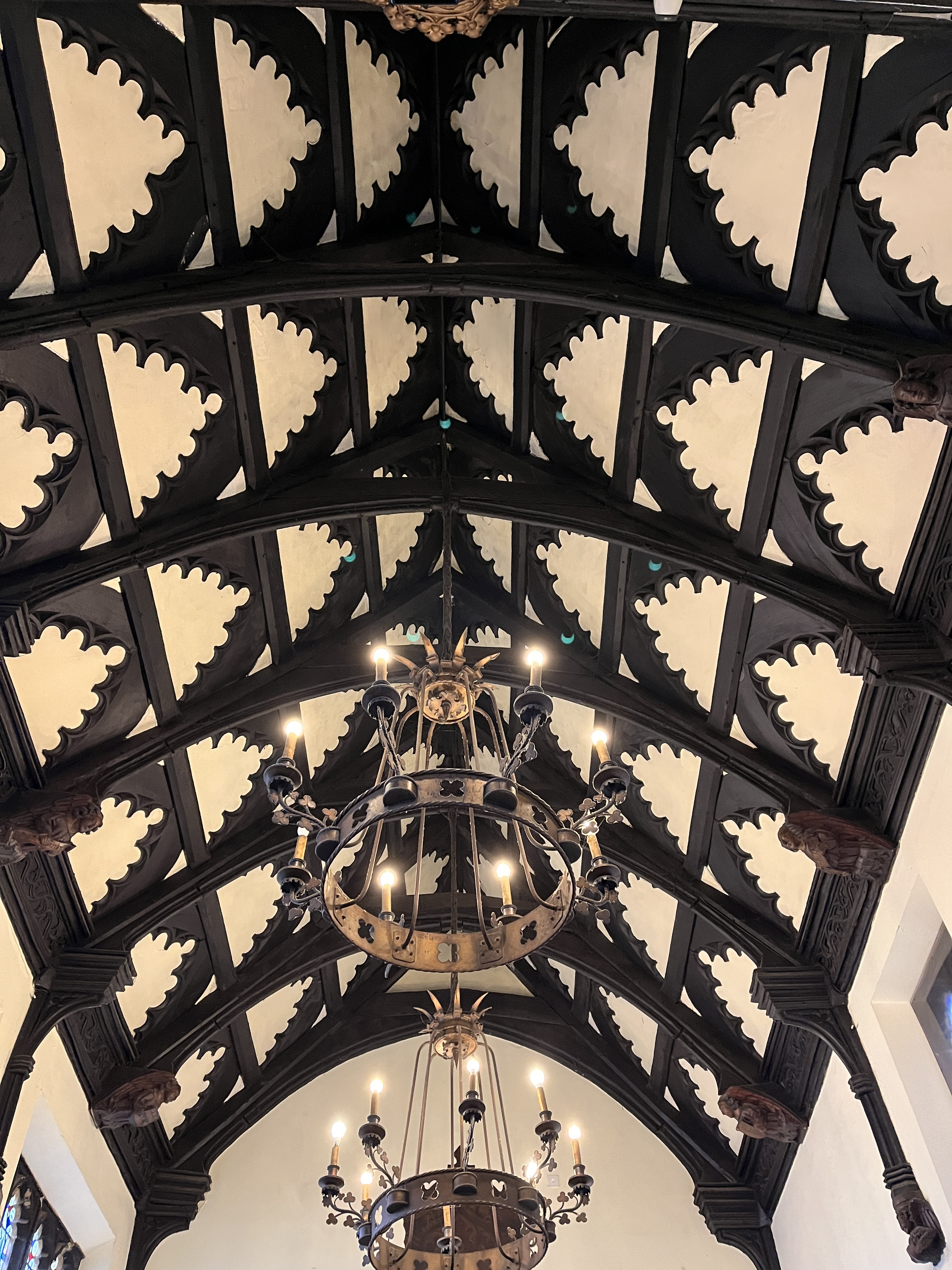
The 15th-century Hall: the timber roof with collar-beams, arched braces, purlins and wind braces.

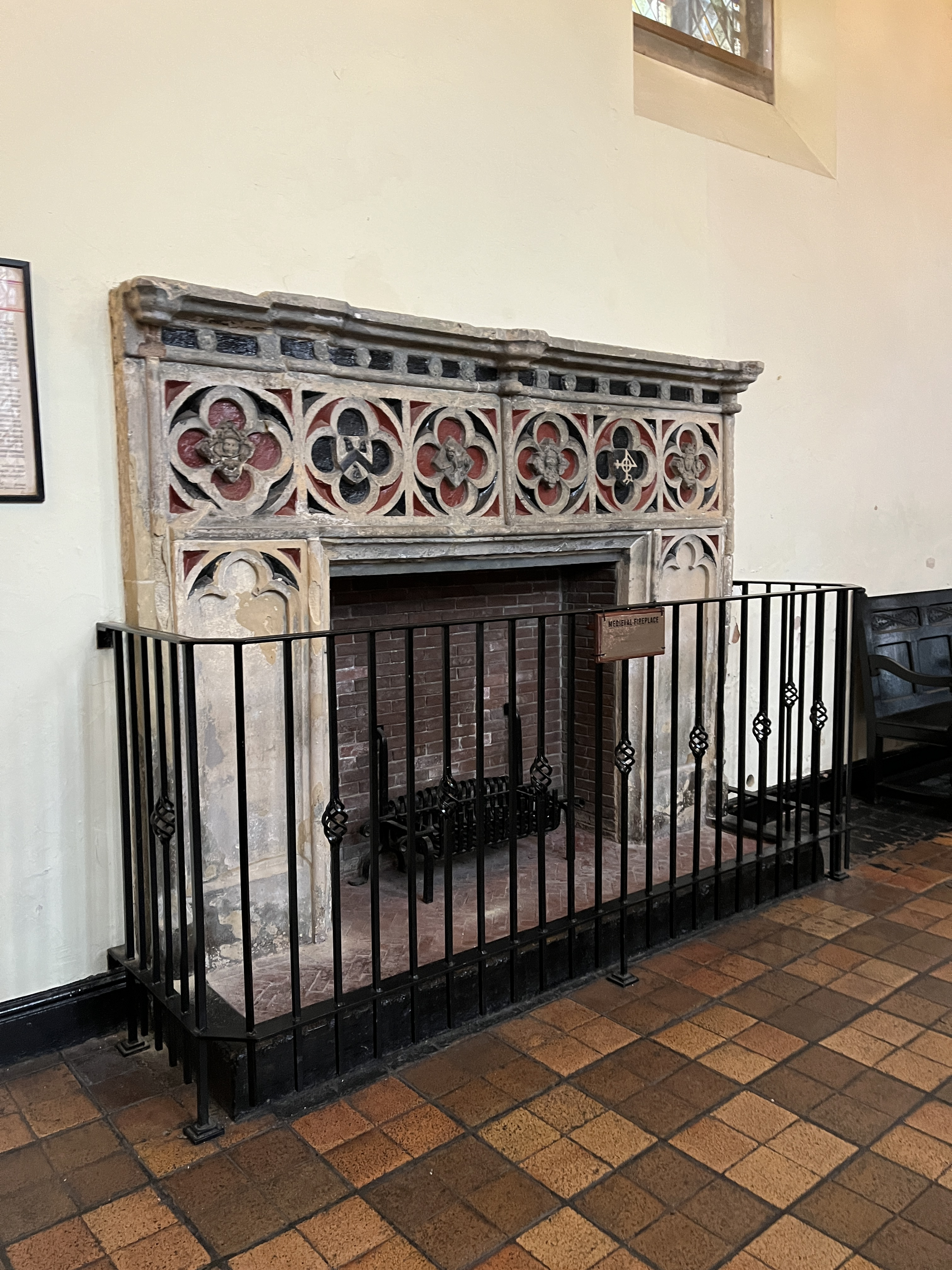
The 15th-century Hall: medieval fireplace against west wall. The paintwork dates from Augustus Pugin's restoration in 1834.

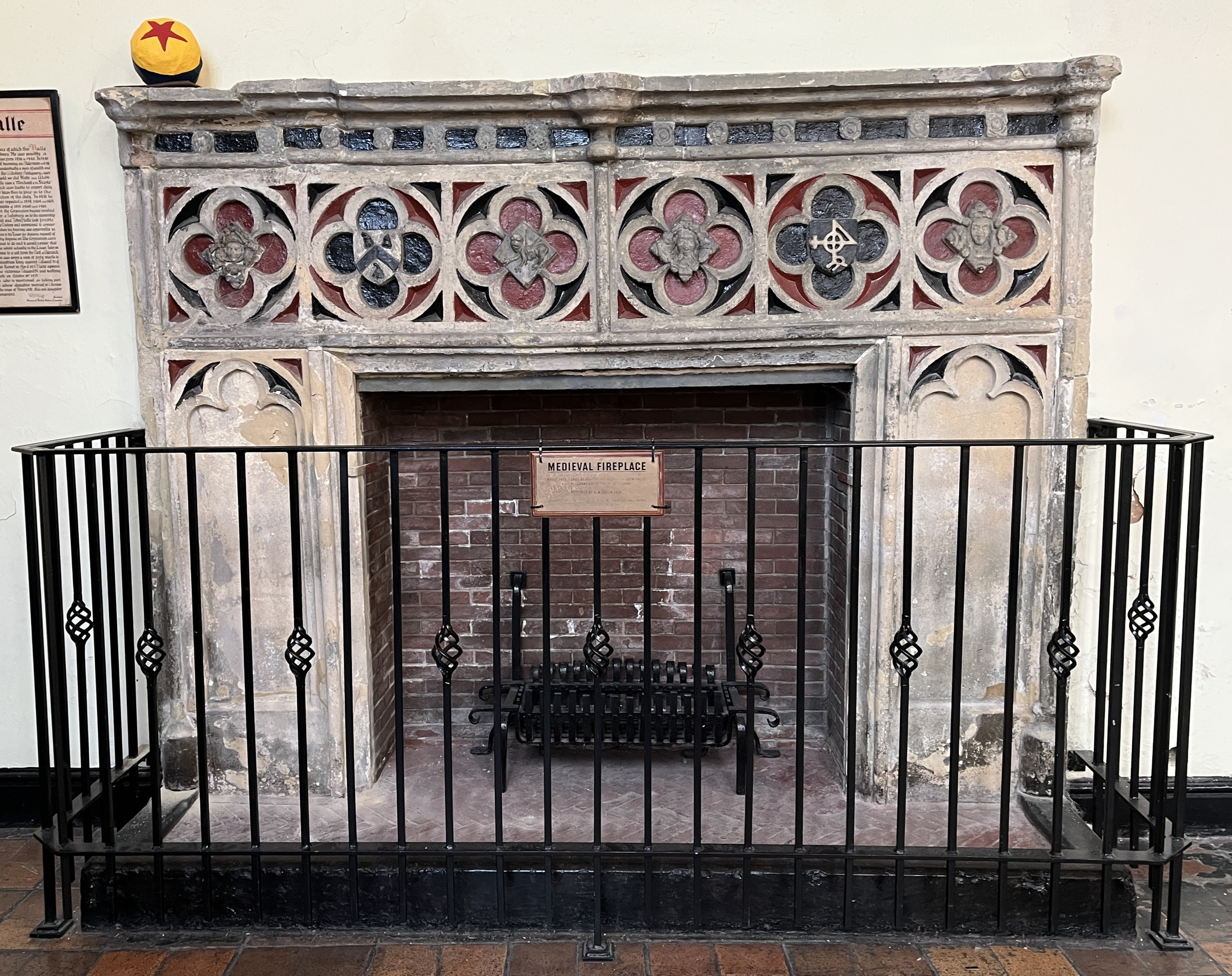
The 15th-century Hall: medieval fireplace against west wall. The paintwork dates from Augustus Pugin's restoration in 1834.

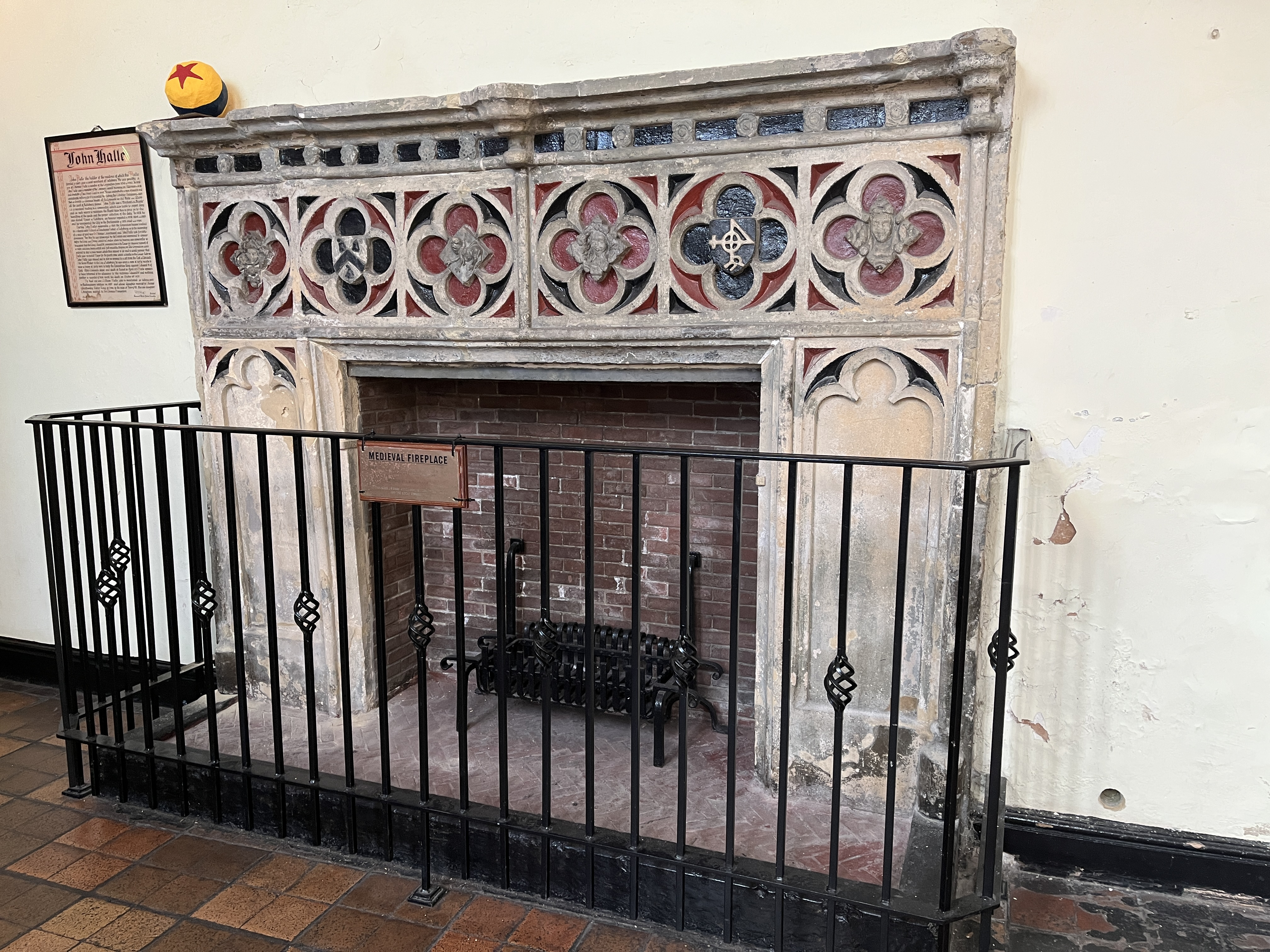
The 15th-century Hall: medieval fireplace against west wall. The paintwork dates from Augustus Pugin's restoration in 1834.

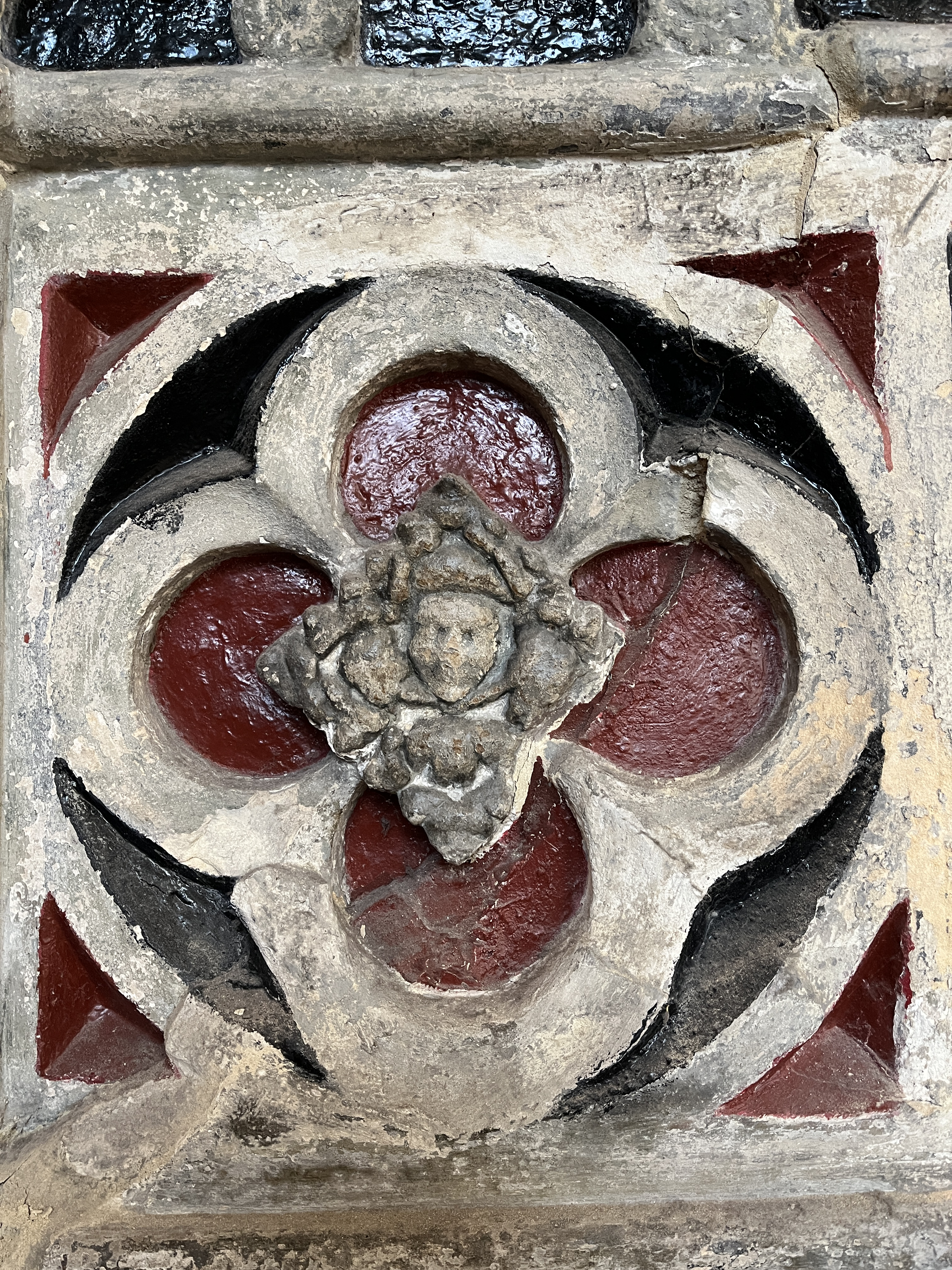
Decorative motif on the medieval fireplace against west wall. The paintwork dates from Augustus Pugin's restoration in 1834.

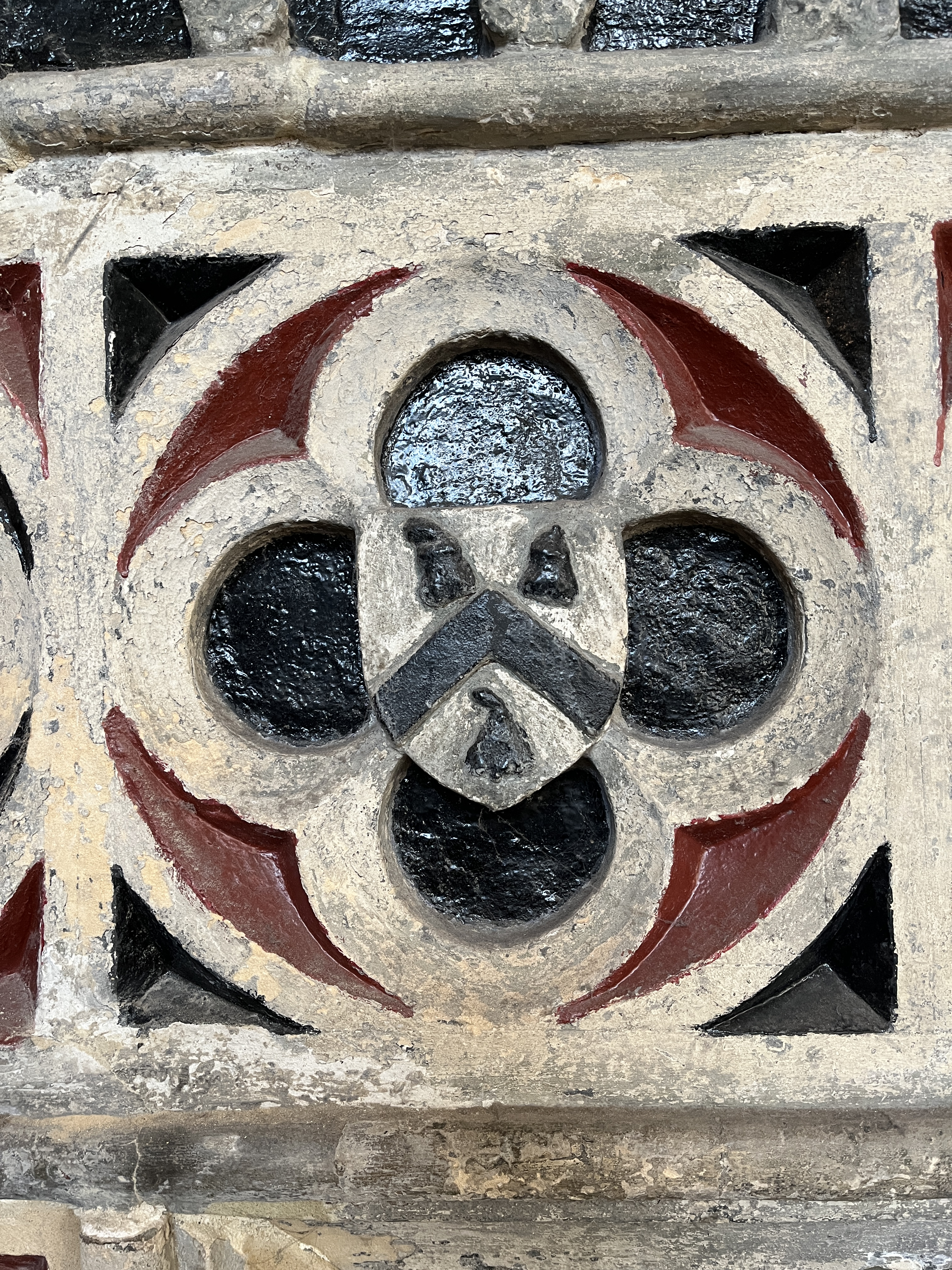
Decorative motif (John Halle's coat of arms) on the medieval fireplace against west wall. The paintwork dates from Augustus Pugin's restoration in 1834.

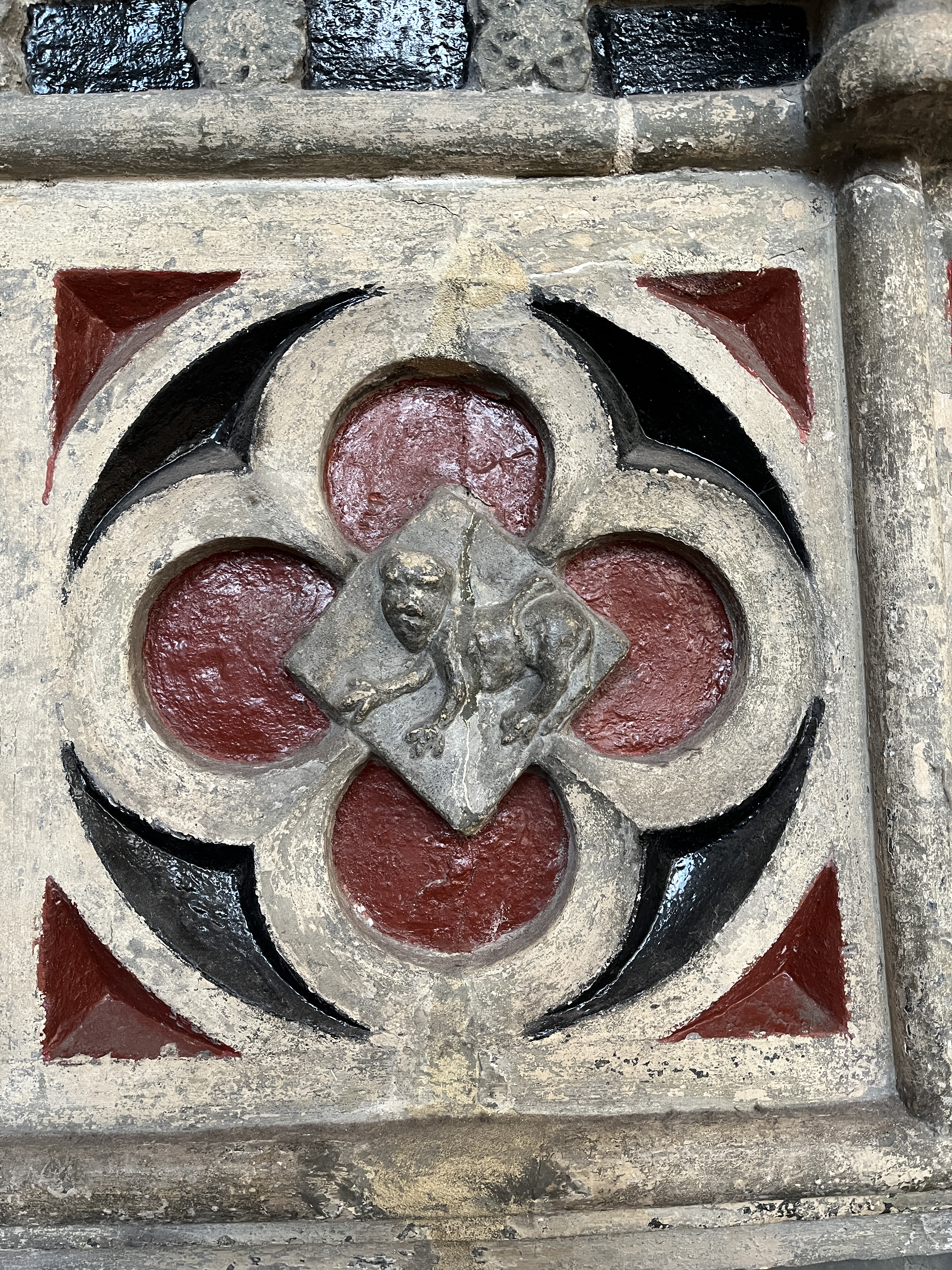
Decorative motif on the medieval fireplace against west wall. The paintwork dates from Augustus Pugin's restoration in 1834.

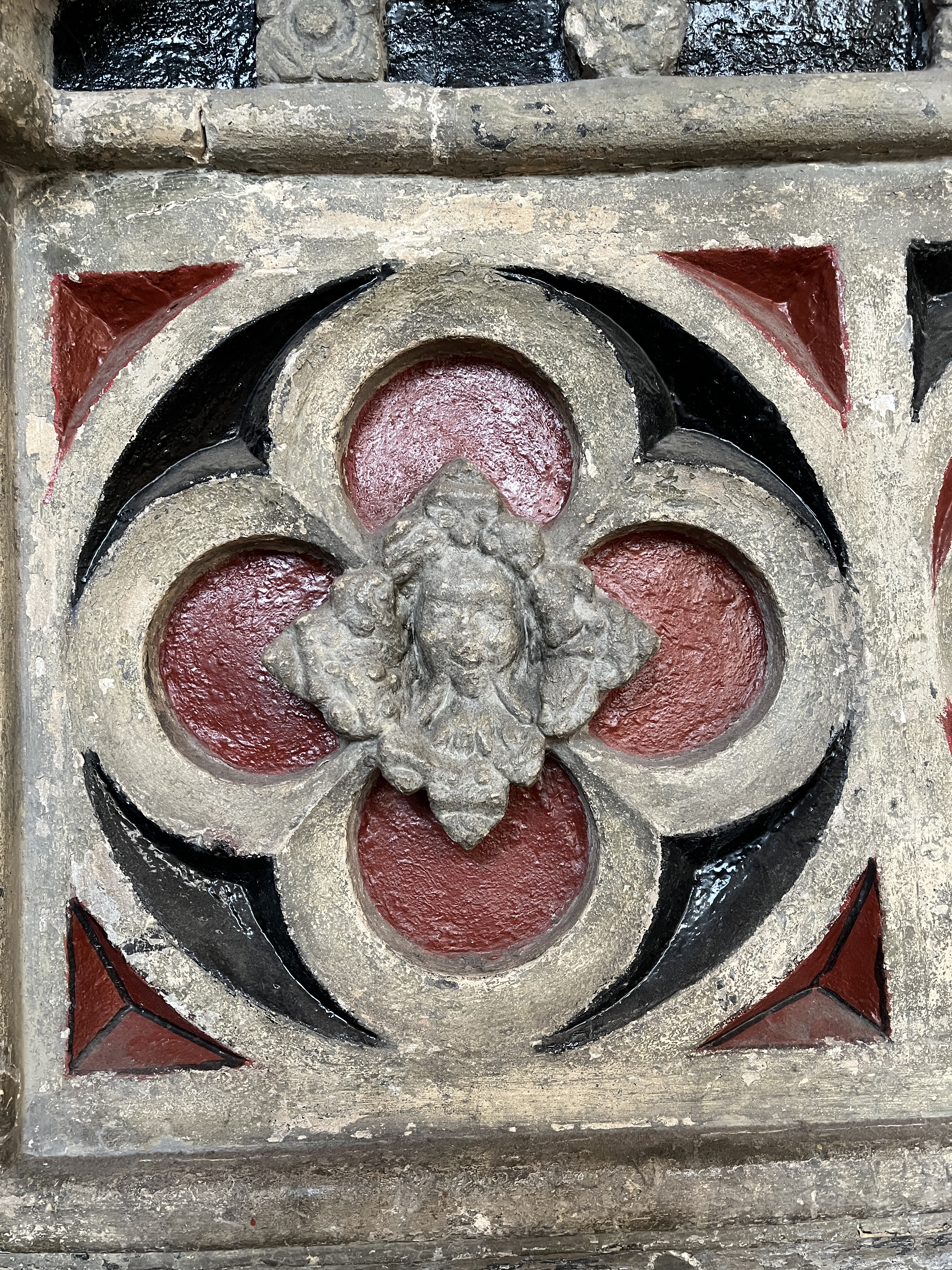
Decorative motif on the medieval fireplace against west wall. The paintwork dates from Augustus Pugin's restoration in 1834.

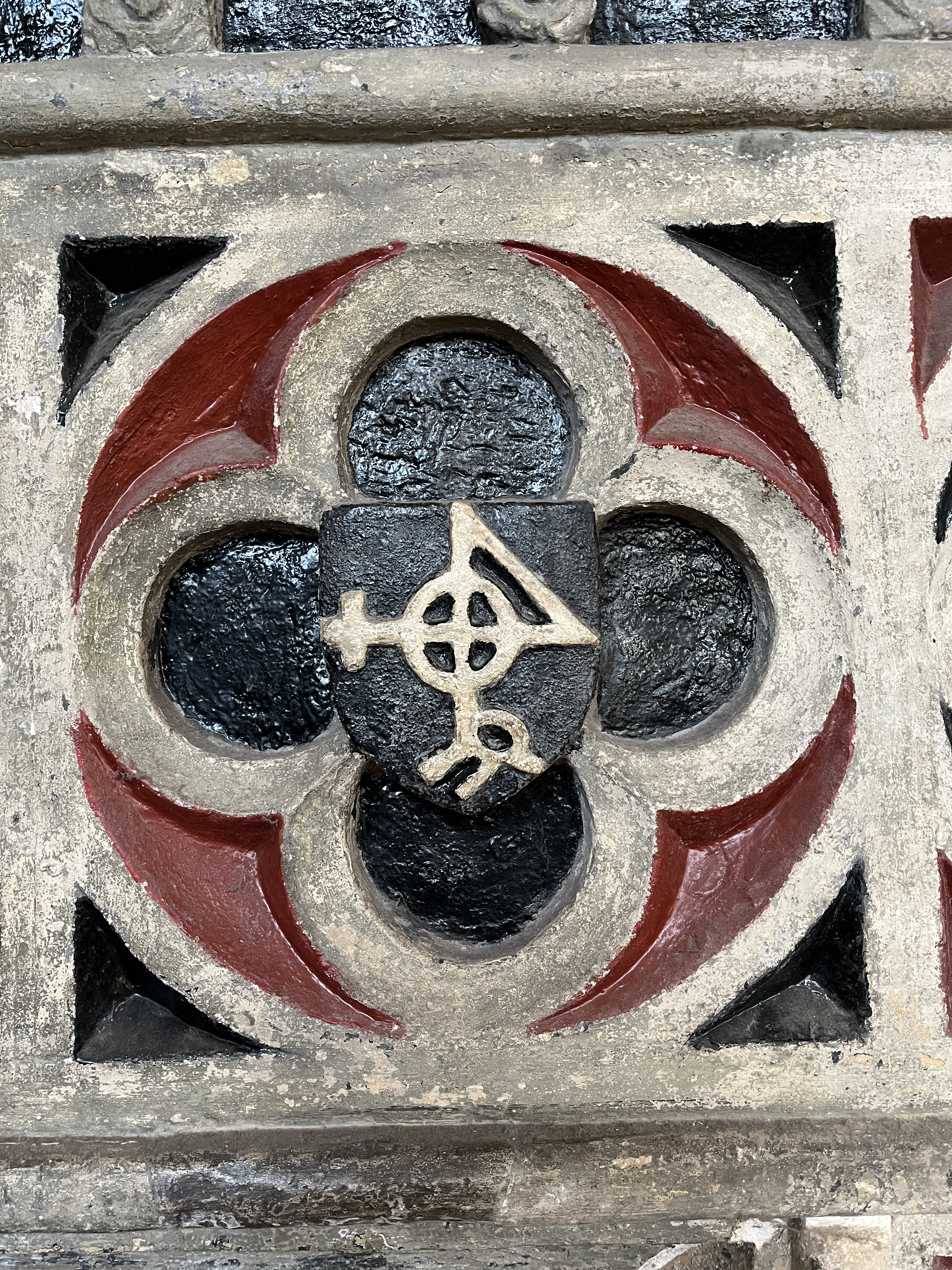
Decorative motif (John Halle's merchant's mark) on the medieval fireplace against west wall. The paintwork dates from Augustus Pugin's restoration in 1834.

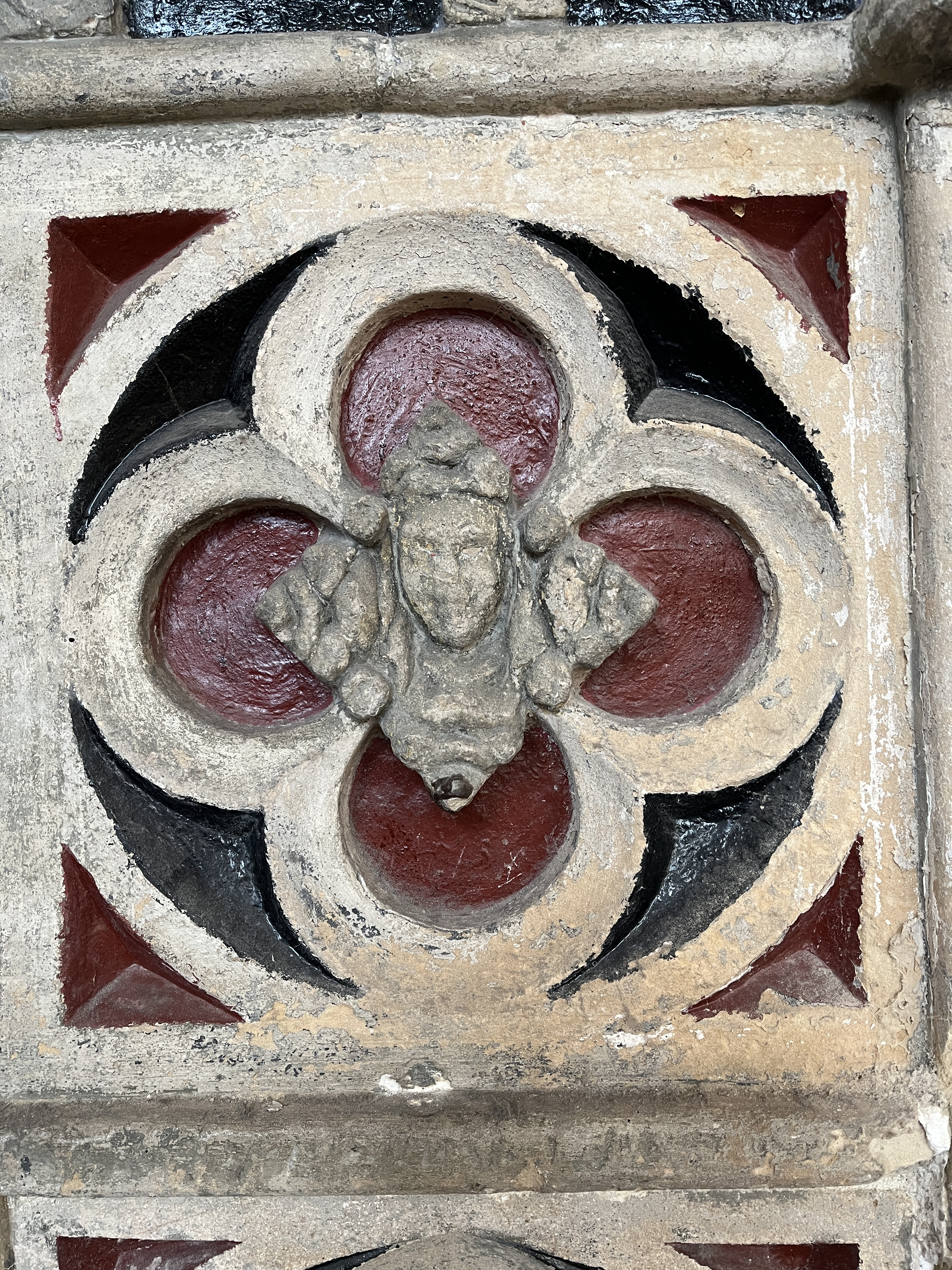
Decorative motif on the medieval fireplace against west wall. The paintwork dates from Augustus Pugin's restoration in 1834.

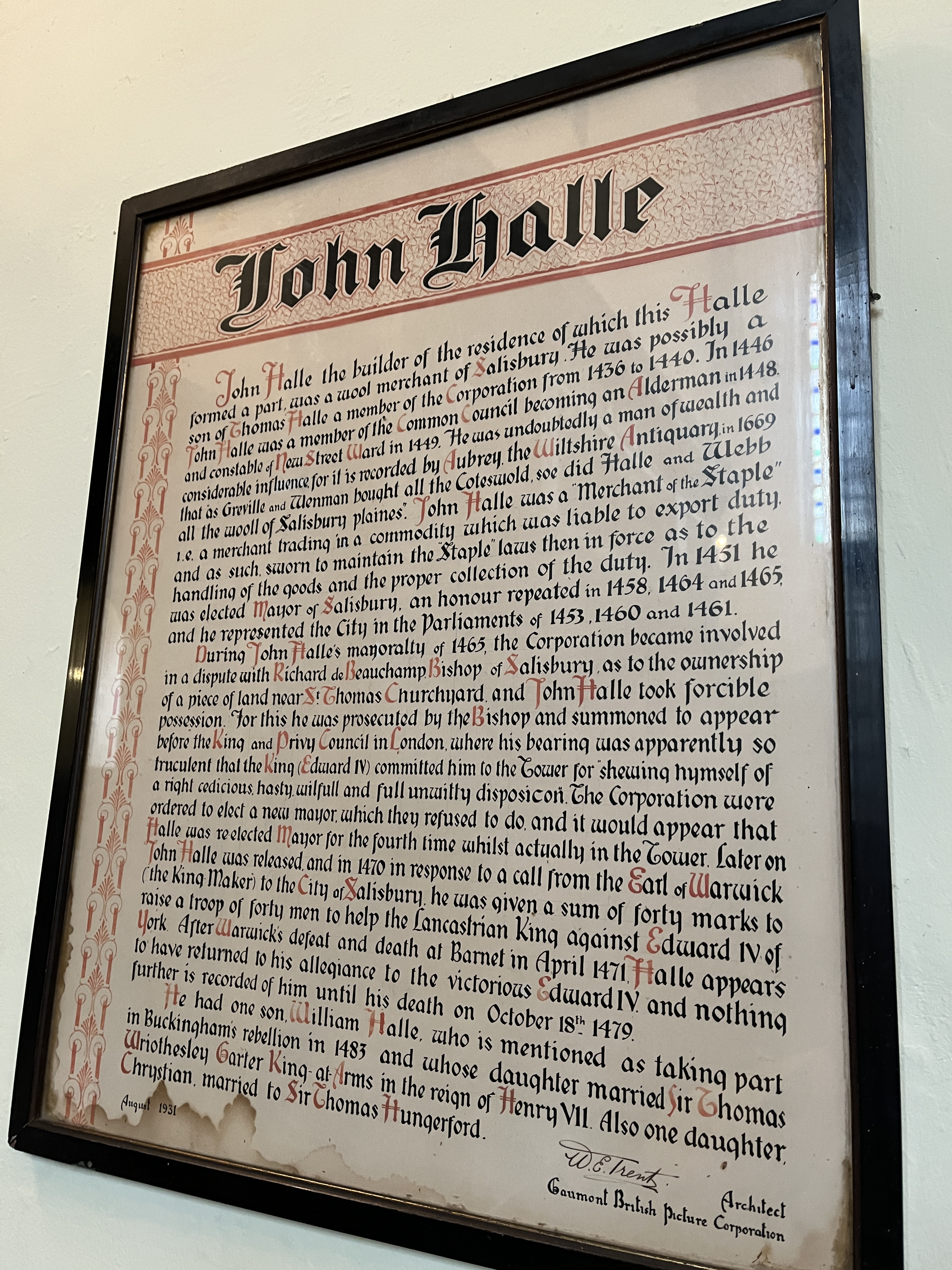
The 15th-century Hall: information panel from August 1931 redevelopment into a cinema.

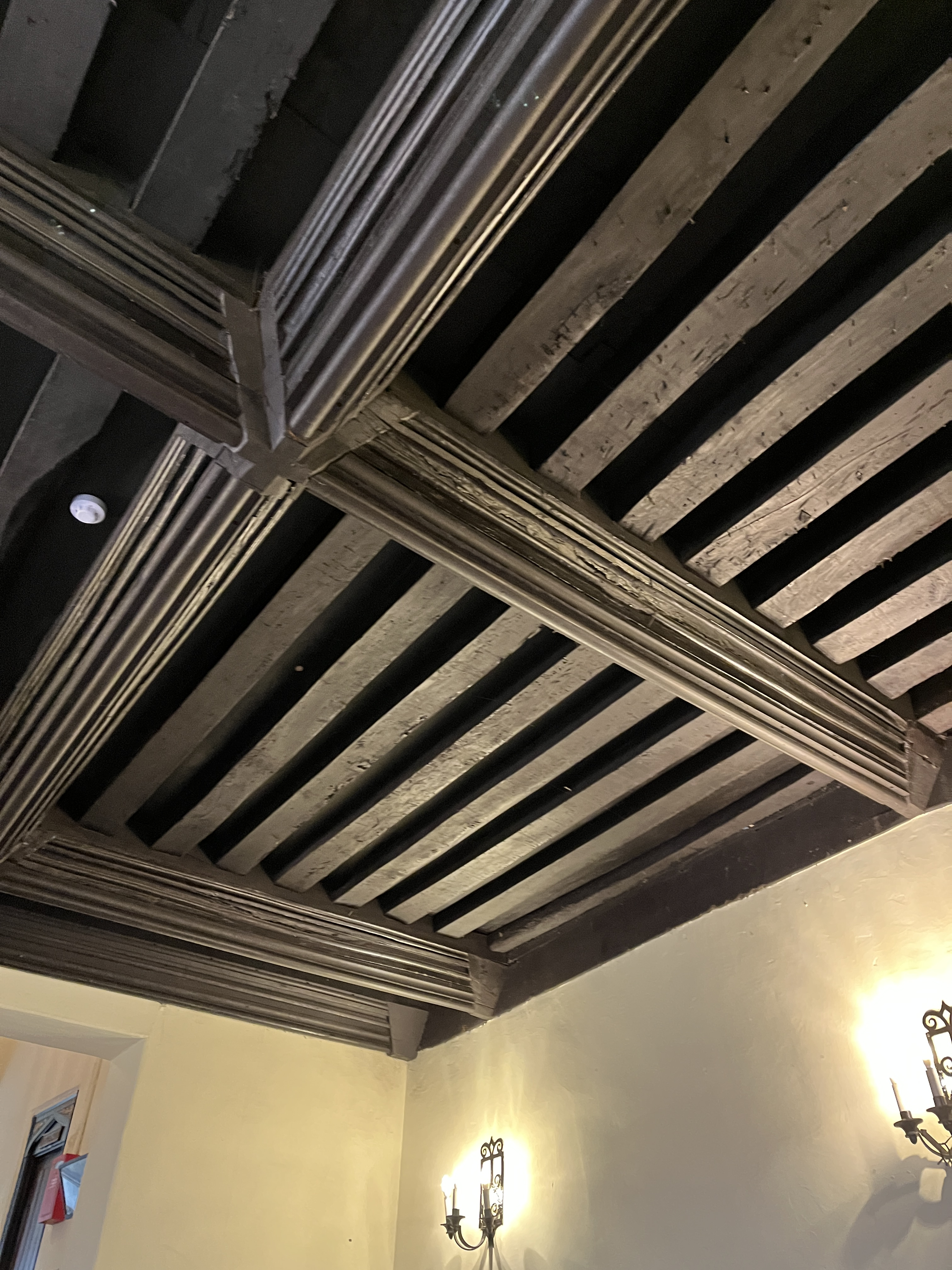
Small inner room: heavily moulded beams of the ceiling of the small inner room to the south of the Hall.

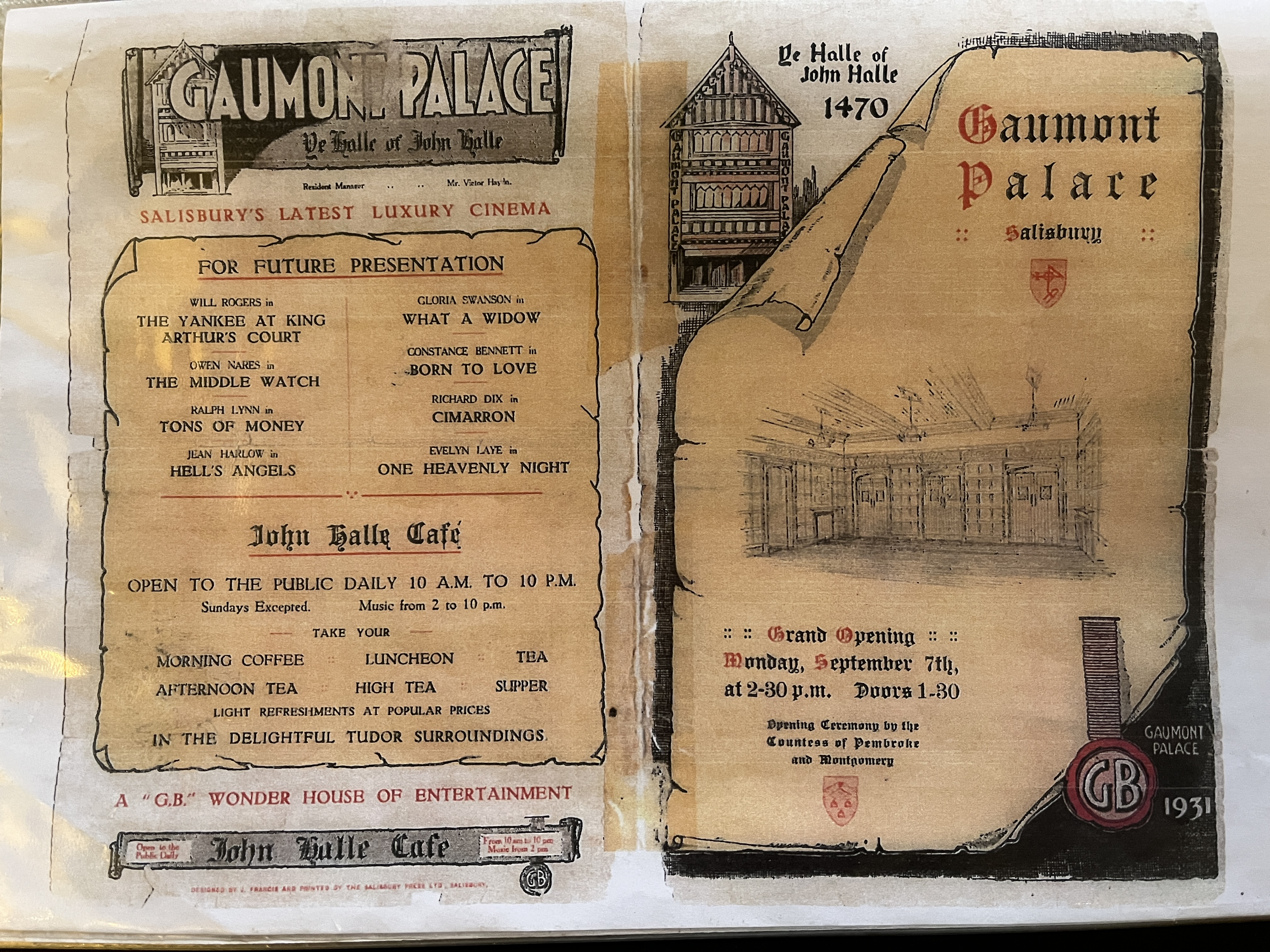
Programme from the opening of the Gaumont Palace (later the Odeon Cinema), 7 September 1931.

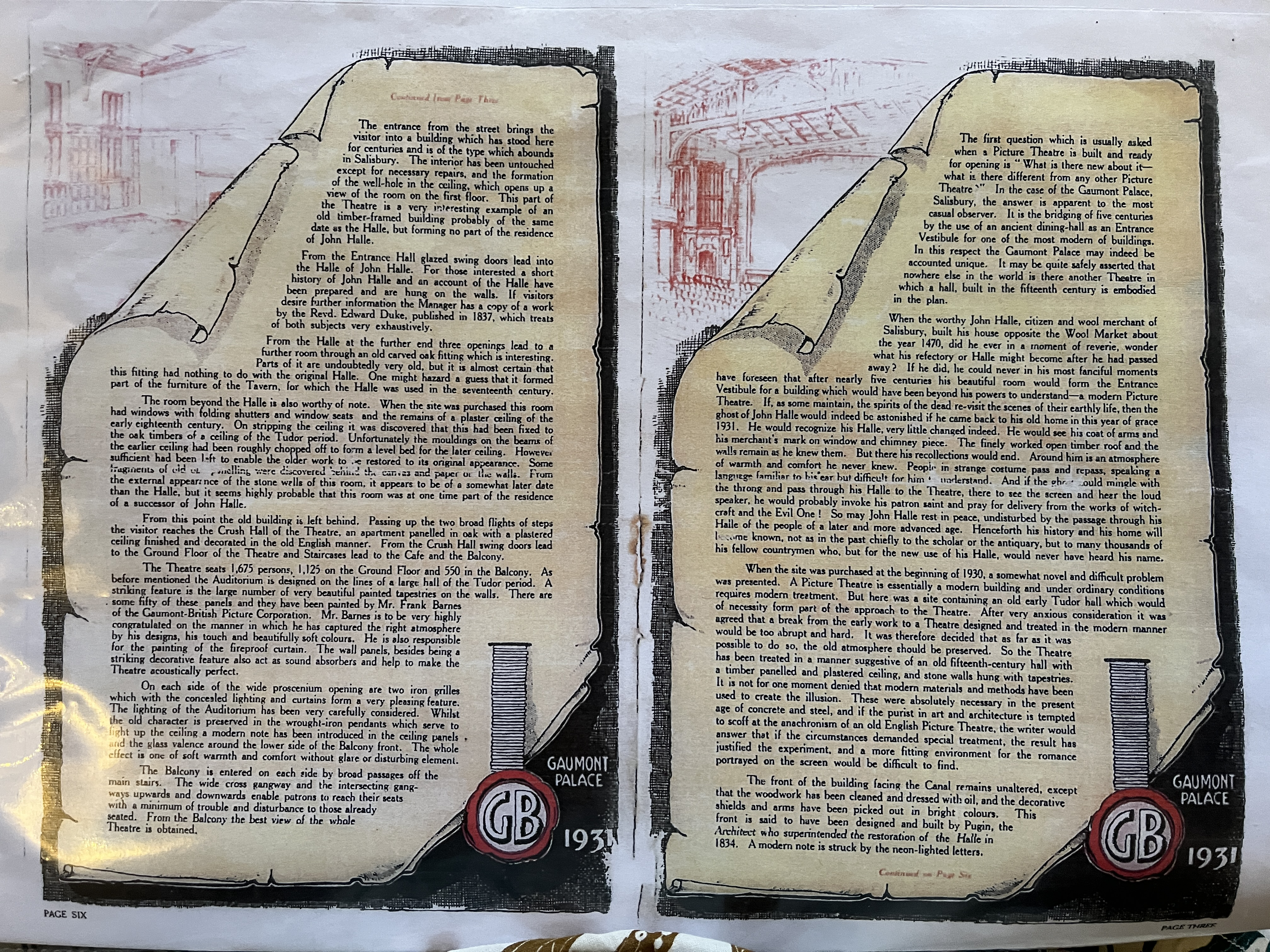
Programme from the opening of the Gaumont Palace (later the Odeon Cinema), 7 September 1931.

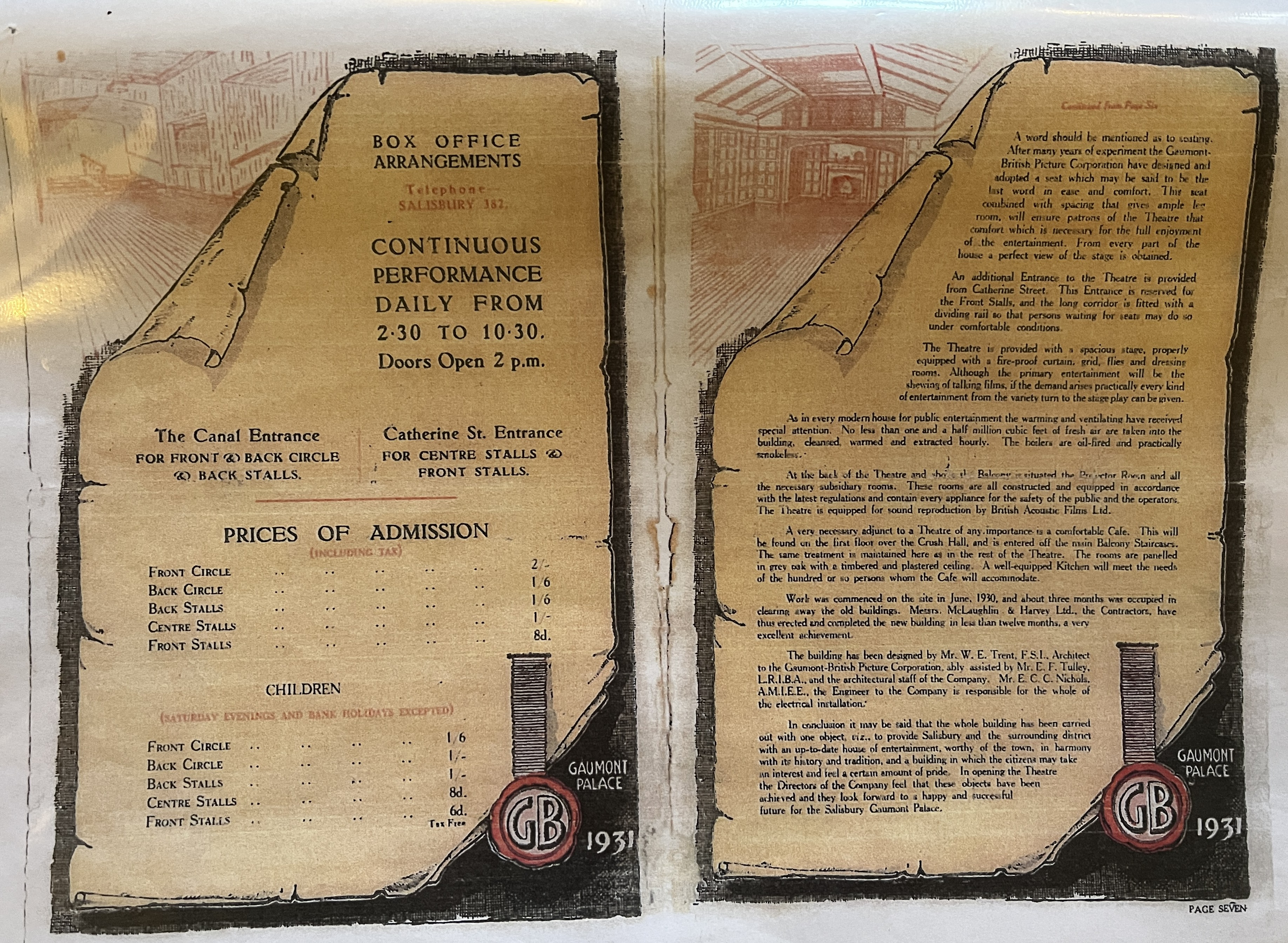
Programme from the opening of the Gaumont Palace (later the Odeon Cinema), 7 September 1931.

== See also ==
- List of Grade I listed buildings in Salisbury
