= Mells War Memorial =

War memorial in Mells, Somerset, England

- United Kingdom
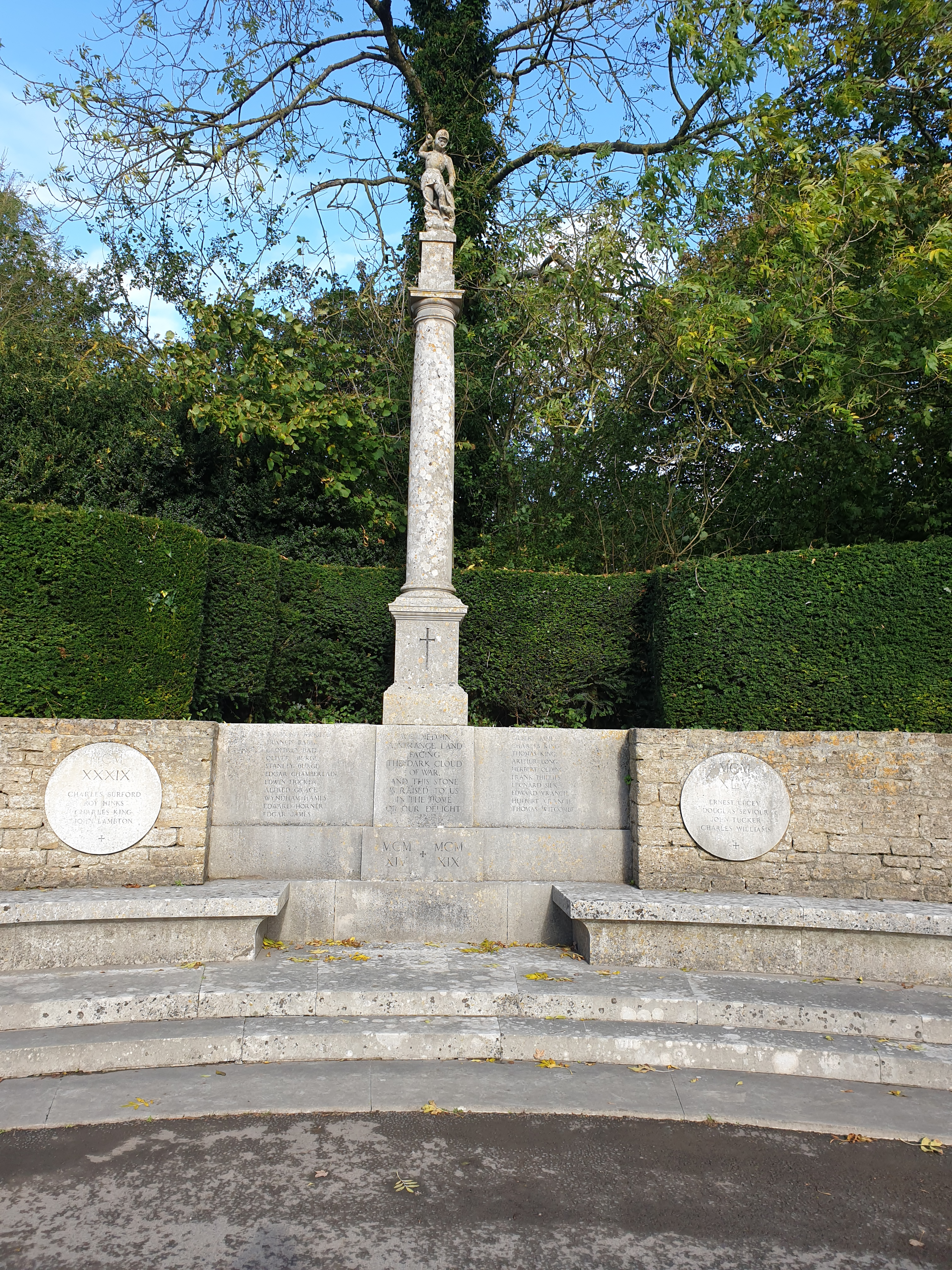
- For servicemen from Mells killed in the First World War
- Unveiled: 26 June 1921
- Location: 51°14′27″N 2°23′22″W; Selwood Street, Mells, Somerset
- Designed by: Sir Edwin Lutyens

Listed Building – Grade II*
- Official name: Mells War Memorial
- Designated: 1 January 1969
- Reference no.: 1058315

Mells War Memorial is a First World War memorial by Sir Edwin Lutyens in the village of Mells in the Mendip Hills of Somerset, south-western England. Unveiled in 1921, the memorial is one of multiple buildings and structures Lutyens designed in Mells. His friendship with two prominent families in the area, the Horners and the Asquiths, led to a series of commissions; among his other works in the village are memorials to two sons—one from each family—killed in the war. Lutyens toured the village with local dignitaries in search of a suitable site for the war memorial, after which he was prompted to remark "all their young men were killed".

The memorial takes the form of a marble column topped by a sculpture of Saint George slaying a dragon, an image Lutyens used on two other public war memorials. At the base of the column, the names of the village's war dead are inscribed on stone panels. The memorial is flanked by identical rubble walls in local stone, on top of which grows a yew hedge. Low stone benches protrude from the walls to allow wreaths to be laid. Additional panels were fixed to the wall after the Second World War to commemorate that conflict. The memorial was unveiled on 26 June 1921 by Brigadier-General Arthur Asquith, whose brother is among those commemorated on it. It is a grade II* listed building and since 2015 has been part of a national collection of Lutyens' war memorials.

== Background ==
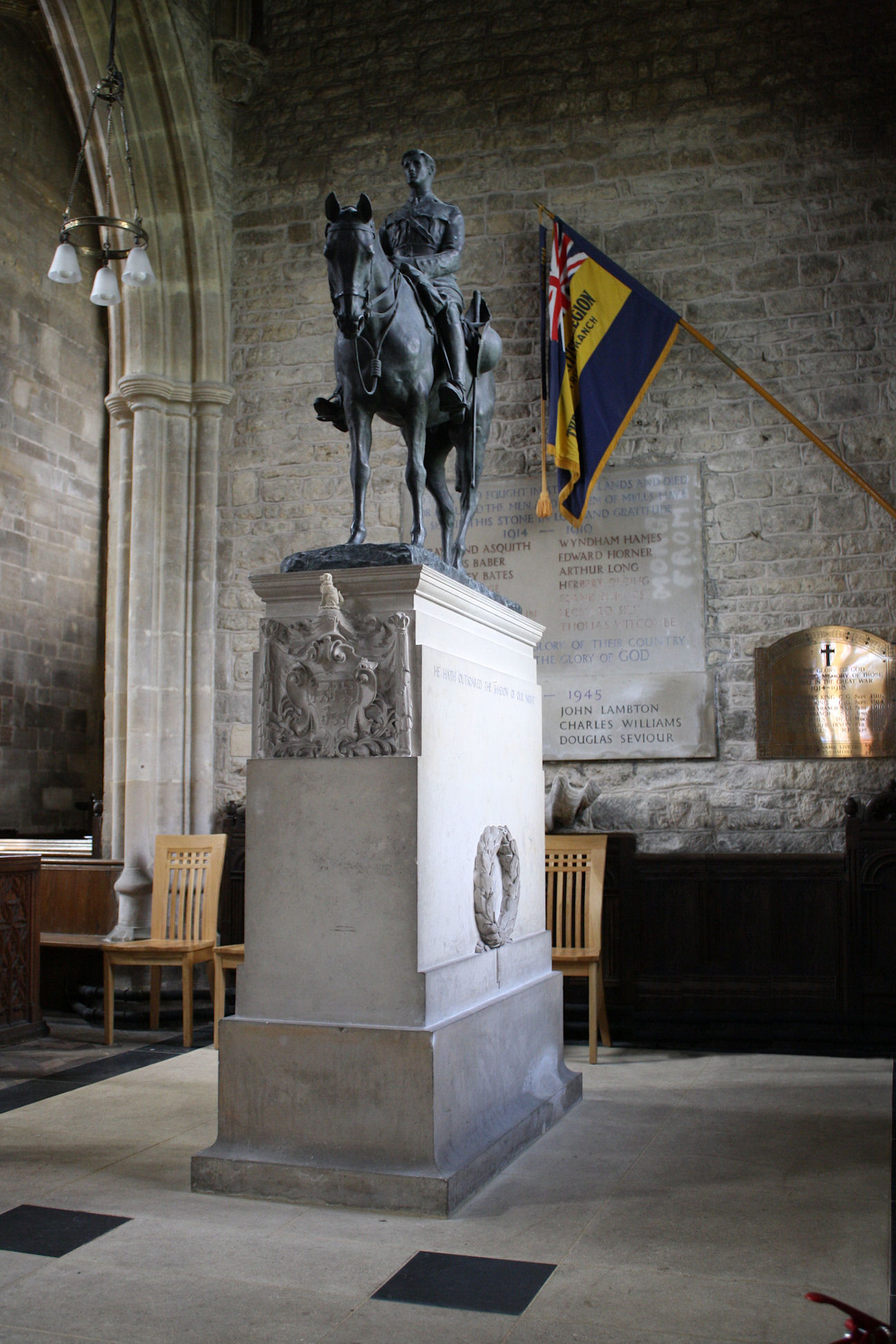
The memorial to Edward Horner in St Andrew's Church; the statue was by Alfred Munnings while Lutyens designed the plinth.

In the aftermath of the First World War, thousands of war memorials were built across Britain. Amongst the most prominent designers of memorials was architect Sir Edwin Lutyens, described by Historic England as "the leading English architect of his generation". Before the war, Lutyens established his reputation designing country houses for wealthy patrons, but from 1917 onwards, he dedicated much of his time to memorialising the casualties of the war. He went on to design the Cenotaph on Whitehall in London, which became the focus for the national Remembrance Sunday commemorations and the Thiepval Memorial to the Missing of the Somme in France, among many other memorials and cemeteries.

According to Tim Skelton, author of Lutyens and the Great War, "if there was one village above all others that would have a war memorial designed by Lutyens, it would be the village of Mells". The war memorial is one of multiple buildings and structures by Lutyens in the village. He was a friend of two prominent local families, the Horners and the Asquiths, through his collaborations with Gertrude Jekyll on country houses and gardens early in his career. Gertrude Jekyll's sister-in-law was Dame Agnes Jekyll, the sister of Lady Horner, who was the incumbent owner (with her husband, Sir John) of Mells Manor, a manor house in the centre of the village dating originally from the 16th century. Shortly after their first meeting, Sir John commissioned Lutyens for renovations to the Horners' London town house. Lutyens first visited Mells in 1896 at the request of Lady Horner (with whom he became close friends), who commissioned him to rebuild the house, and later for several other works related to the manor.

The Horners' son, Edward, was killed at the Battle of Cambrai on the Western Front in November 1917 and is among those named on the war memorial. The family separately commissioned Lutyens to design a memorial to him in St Andrew's Church—a large statue of a mounted cavalry officer (by Alfred Munnings), which stands on a plinth by Lutyens based on the Cenotaph. In the same church is a memorial to Raymond Asquith (the Horners' son-in-law and the eldest son of the prime minister, H. H. Asquith), designed by Lutyens and executed by Eric Gill. Raymond was killed in the Battle of the Somme in 1916. Both men are listed on the village war memorial.

By 1916, 74 men from Mells had left to fight, and several women, including Lady Horner, were working as nurses in France. By the end of the war, 21 men had been killed and multiple others wounded. Among the returned was the curate of St Andrew's Church, who earned the Military Cross for saving a wounded soldier.

== Commissioning ==
Mells' war dead were first commemorated by a stone tablet on a wall in St Andrew's Church, designed by the Kensington School of Art and listing the names of 14 villagers. The idea for a larger, public memorial originated with the Horner family, who called a public meeting to discuss the possibilities. The participants first considered whether the memorial should be something with a utilitarian function or something purely monumental. Suggestions for utilitarian memorials included benches, a fountain, a garden, and a children's playground, but they felt that the memorial should be something to be looked at and admired. After discussing various potential locations, including St Andrew's churchyard, they decided that the memorial should be on the road in a prominent position where it would be obvious to passers-by.

As with most of his war memorial commissions, Lutyens walked around the village in August 1919 to examine possible sites for the memorial. He was accompanied by Katharine Asquith (Sir John and Lady Frances Horner's daughter and Raymond Asquith's widow) and a group of representatives from the village. Lutyens was moved by the villagers' personal loss and wrote in a letter to his wife, Emily: "My weekend was a spring day, fun and tears. All their young men were killed". He told Emily he had "found a perfect site in the middle of the village, which no-one else found, or thought of, and with a little tact and patience it was carried by the villagers with acclaim".

== Design ==
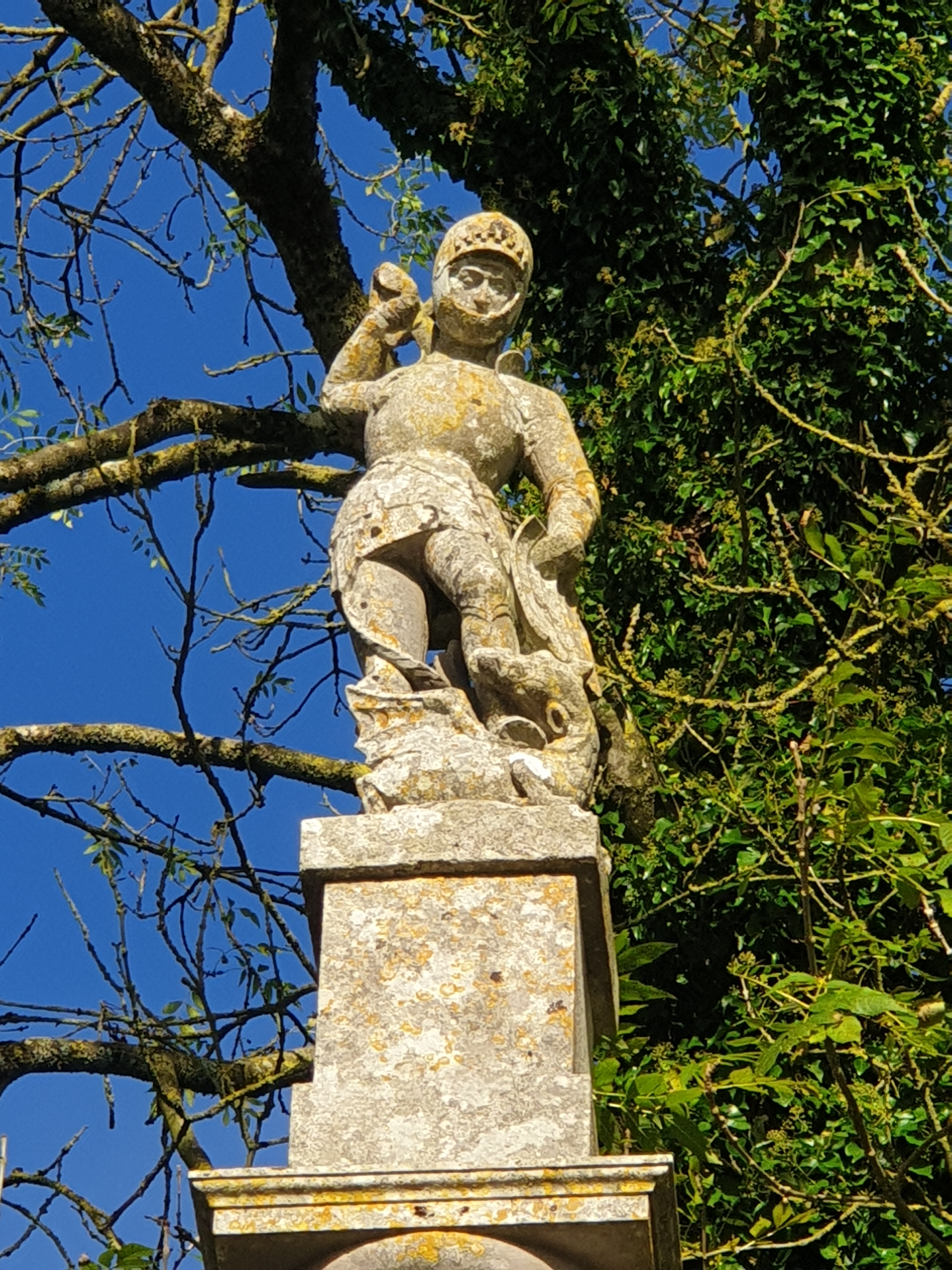
Close-up of St George atop the memorial

The memorial takes the form of a Tuscan column of Purbeck Marble construction, on which stands a statue of Saint George slaying a dragon. Lady Horner first hoped to have an original sculpture and approached several artists but all quotes she received would have exceeded the village's budget, so she instead commissioned a copy of a statue in the Henry VII Chapel in Westminster Abbey. The column stands on a tall, narrow pedestal in Portland stone that bears the inscription: WE DIED IN A STRANGE LAND FACING THE DARK CLOUD OF WAR AND THIS STONE IS RAISED TO US IN THE HOME OF OUR DELIGHT; MCMXIV & MCMXIX, a verse suggested by Robert Bridges, the poet laureate, in correspondence with Lady Horner. A cross is engraved immediately above.

To either side of the pedestal are matching panels onto which are inscribed the names of the village's war dead. At the same height are flanking walls of coarsed, squared rubble from the nearby Doulting Stone Quarry, set back at the ends and topped with a yew hedge. In front of each wall is a small stone bench that protrudes across the base of the column, and above the benches, fixed to the wall, are round plaques bearing the dates of the Second World War and the names of the village's dead from that conflict. The statue and the inscriptions are both the work of Eric Gill, who also carved the memorial to Raymond Asquith. Colin Amery, who chaired an exhibition of Lutyens' works after his death, describes the memorials at Mells as among Lutyens' finest.

Lutyens was profoundly affected by the war and sought a new form of architecture to memorialise the Lost Generation. He generally preferred abstract designs for his war memorials, of which he designed dozens, over allegorical or figurative sculpture or the overt religious imagery that was present in many First World War memorials. Mells is one of the few monuments in which he used such allegory (in this case, the statue of Saint George). It is the most intricate of Lutyens' civic memorials to feature a statue of Saint George, though his memorial inside Wellington College's chapel features a similar sculpture of George and the Dragon. Fordham War Memorial in Cambridgeshire and Hove War Memorial in East Sussex both feature less intricate bronze statues of George with a sword and shield.

Close-up views of the memorial

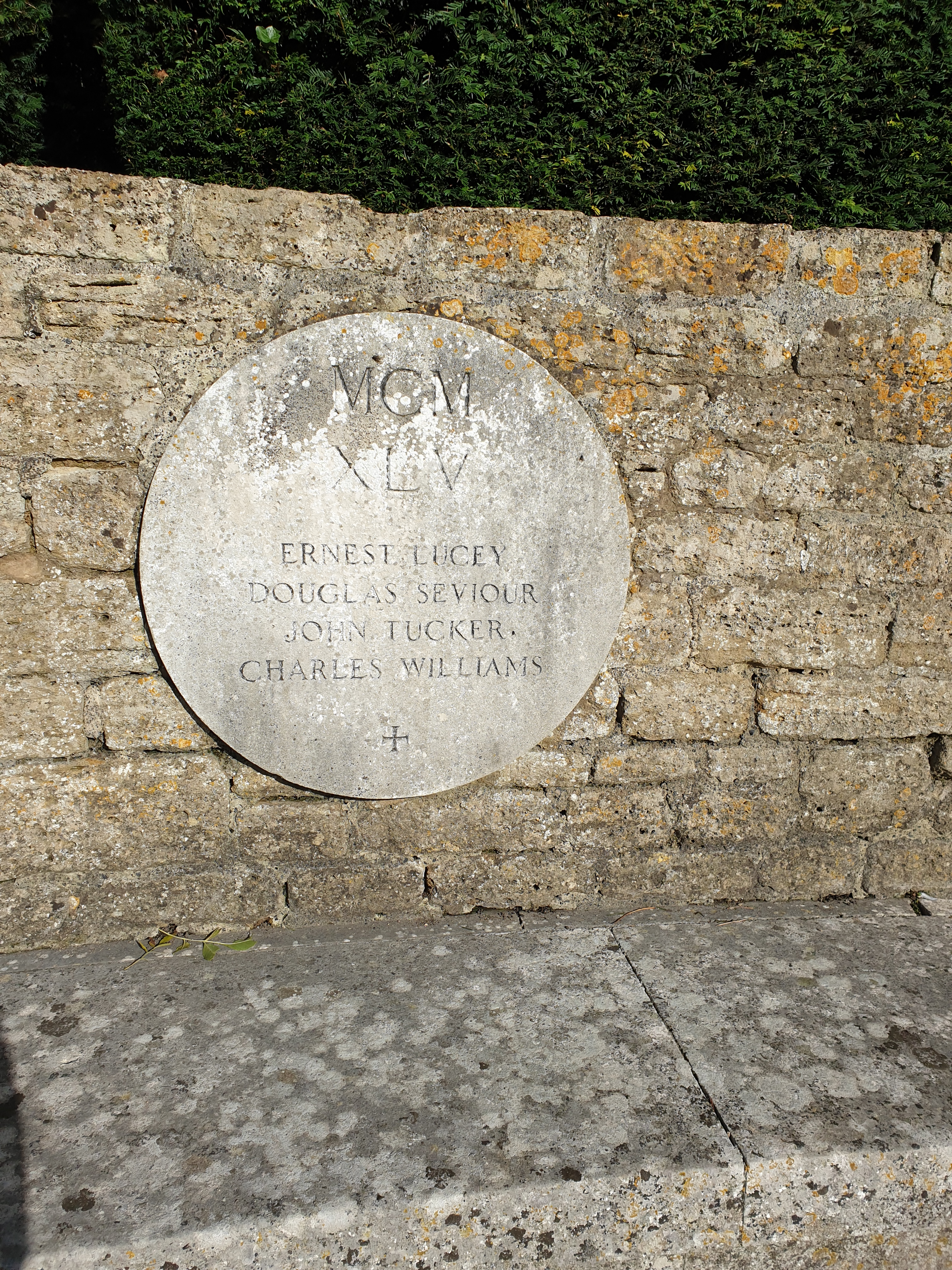
Left plaque

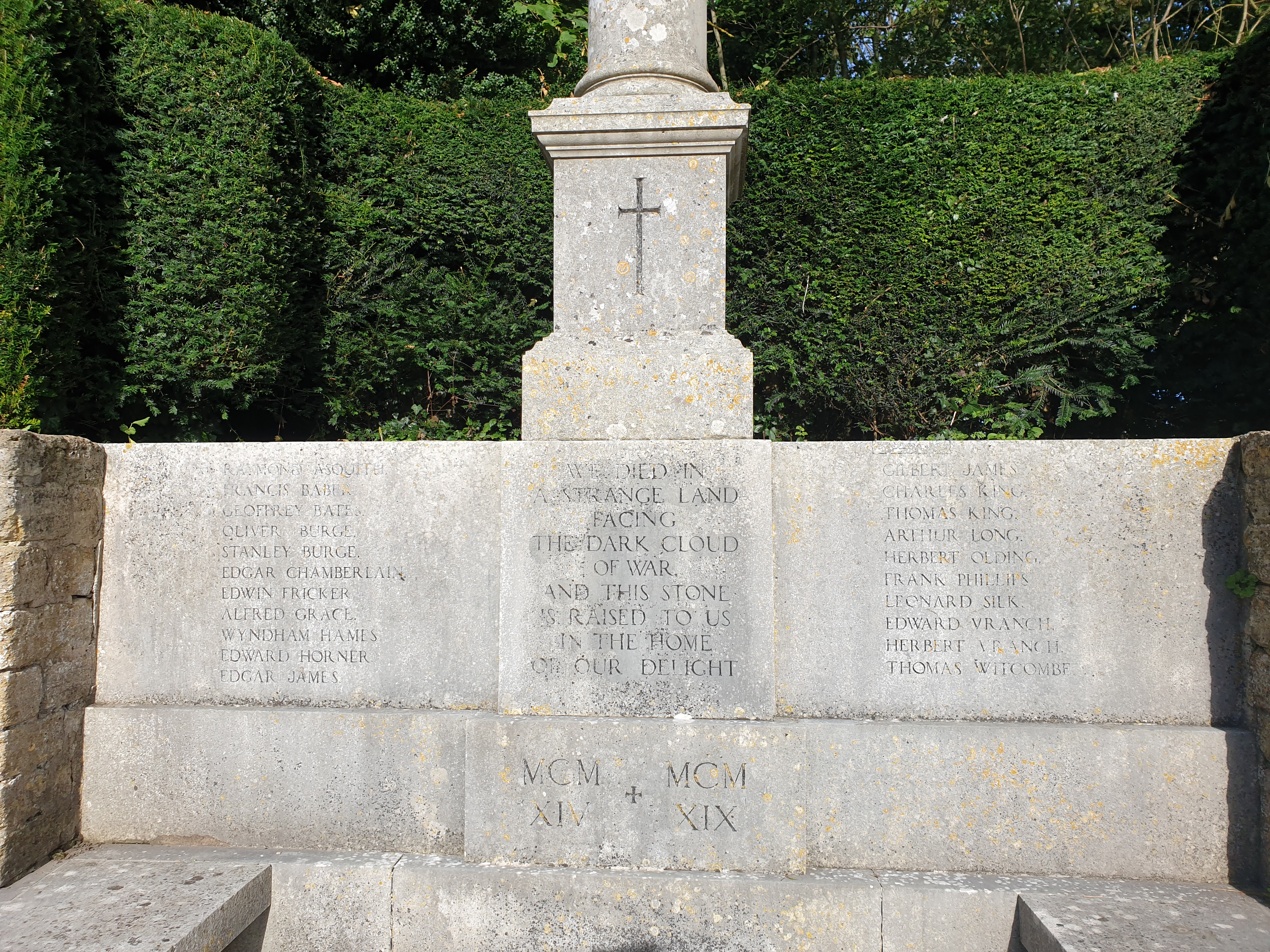
Centre stone

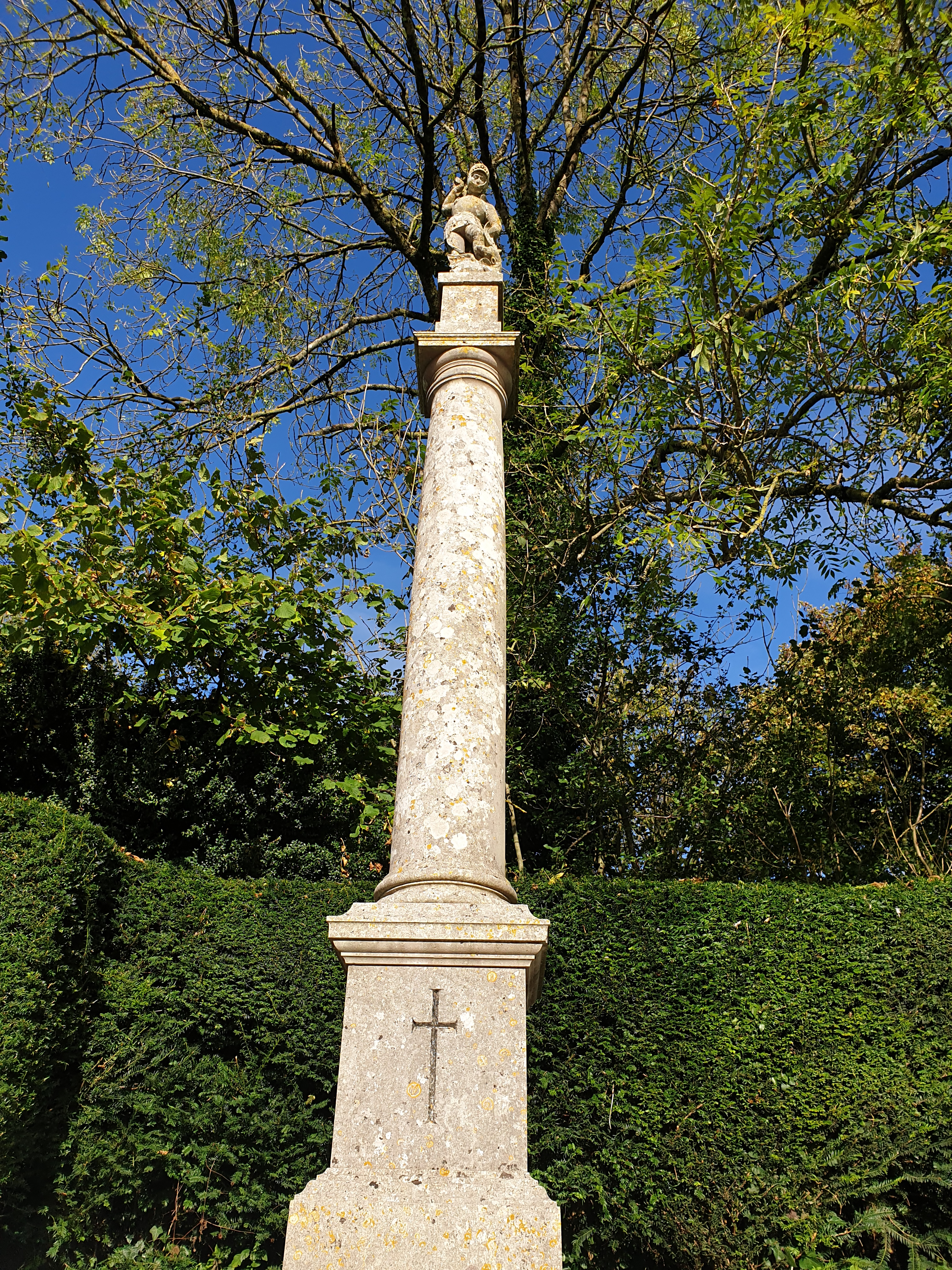
Column

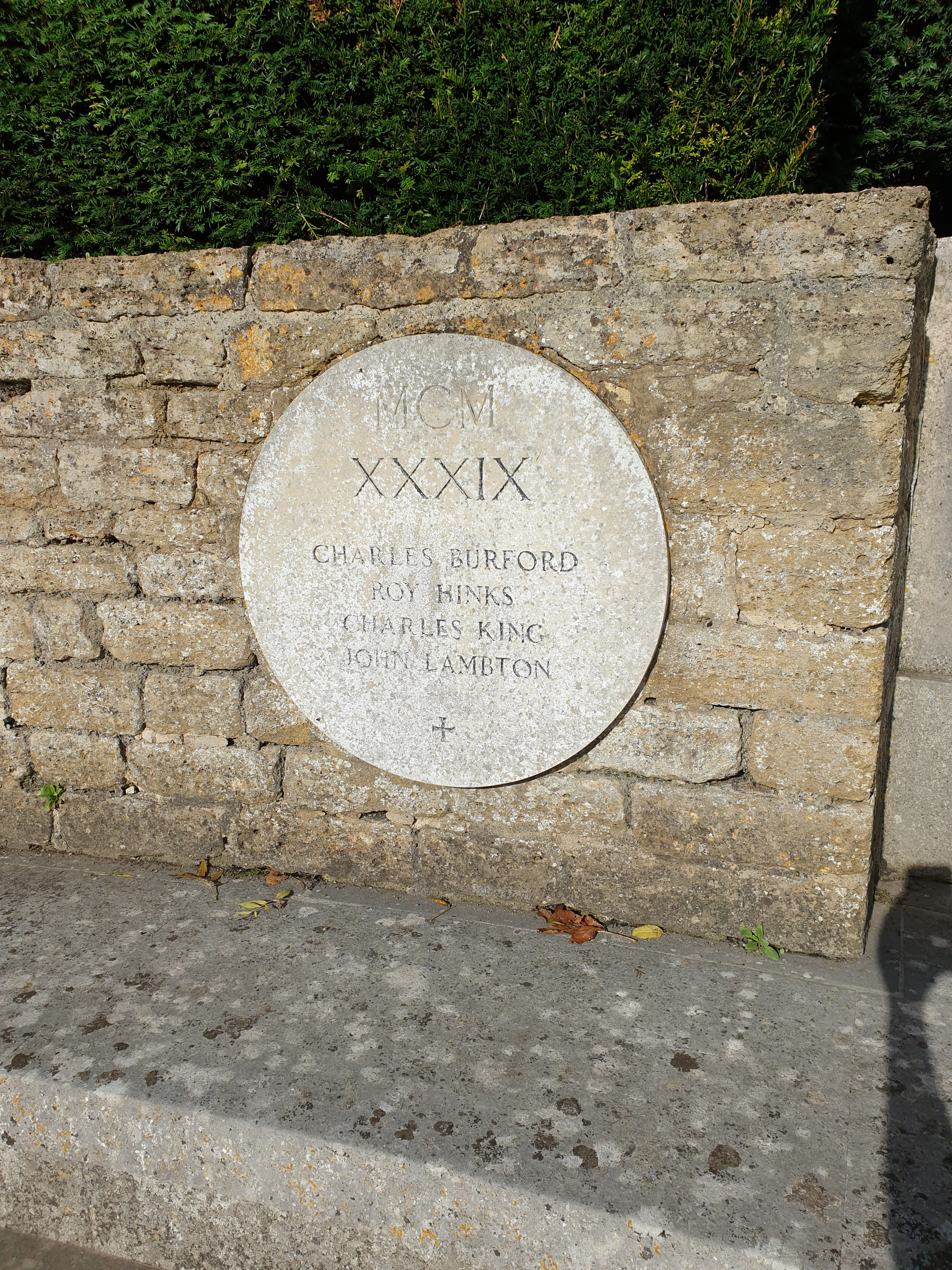
Right plaque

== History ==
The memorial was unveiled at a ceremony on 26 June 1921. It cost £400 to build, which was raised by public subscription. The unveiling was performed by Brigadier-General Arthur Asquith, brother of Raymond Asquith, who is commemorated on the memorial. General Asquith was later instrumental in the creation of Lutyens' Royal Naval Division War Memorial outside the Admiralty building in London.

Mells War Memorial was designated a grade II* listed building on 1 January 1969 and noted for its setting with the village hall (which is also listed at grade II*) and the various other historic buildings in the village, including several by Lutyens. Listed building status offers statutory protection from demolition or modification; grade II* is reserved for "particularly important buildings of more than special interest" and applied to about 5.5% of listings. In November 2015, as part of commemorations for the centenary of the First World War, Historic England recognised Lutyens' war memorials as a "national collection".

== See also ==
- Mells Park House (Lutyens, 1925)
- Grade II* listed buildings in Mendip
- Grade II* listed war memorials in England
