= Statue of Queen Victoria, Hove =

Statue in Hove, East Sussex, England

Statue of Queen Victoria
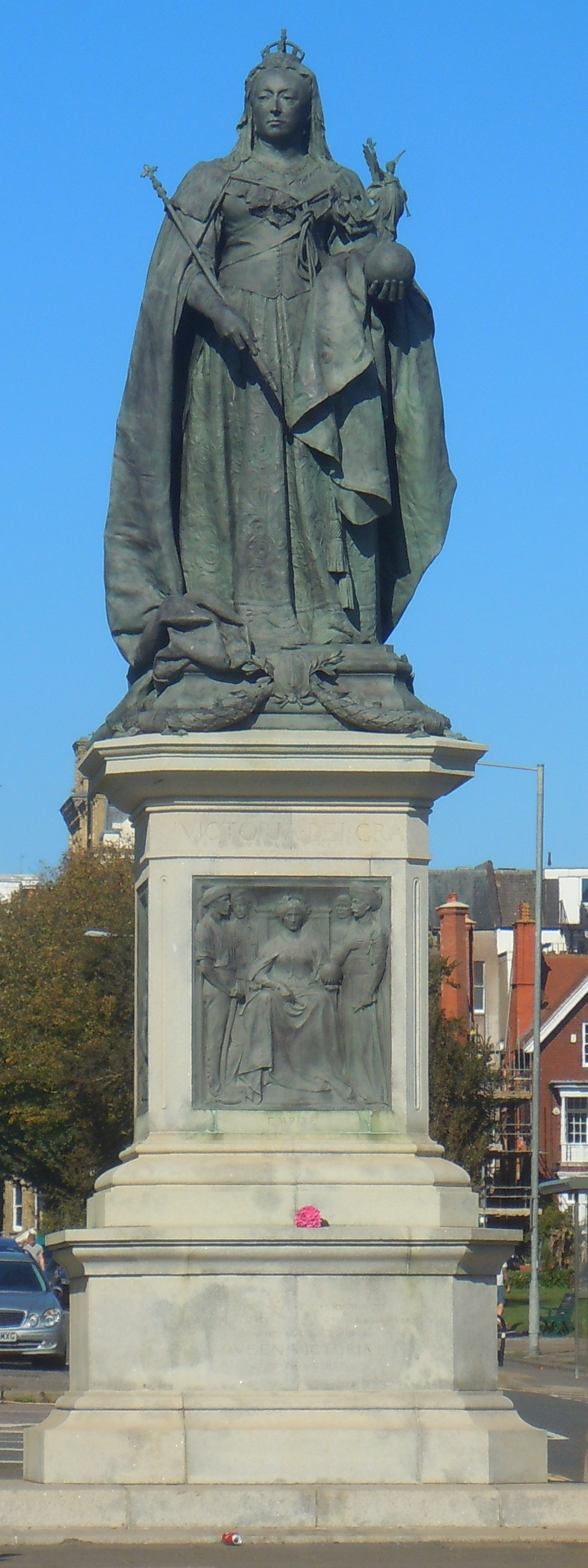
- The statue in 2018
- Artist: Thomas Brock
- Year: 1901
- Completion date: 9 February
- Medium: Bronze
- Subject: Queen Victoria
- Location: Hove, England; 50.82463°N 0.16925°W

The Statue of Queen Victoria stands on the sea front at the bottom of Grand Avenue in Hove on the south coast of England. The statue is one of 14 by Thomas Brock and was unveiled in February 1901, the month after Queen Victoria's death. It is a Grade II listed building.

== History ==
The statue is one of fourteen of Queen Victoria by Thomas Brock and the first of them to be completed after the monarch's death. Brock designed the statue in 1897, having been commissioned for Victoria's diamond jubilee, which provided work for many sculptors. It was not unveiled until 9 February 1901, a month after she died. Hove's statue was the fourth of fourteen by Brock of Queen Victoria to be commissioned. It cost £3,000. The committee wanted a large memorial (it asked Brock to "design a Memorial Statue of large proportions and of the highest class"), so Brock made Victoria taller than his previous version in Worcester and increased the perception of height by placing the statue on a substantial plinth. Similar versions appear in Carlisle, Birmingham, and Belfast, though Brock's most famous work was the Victoria Memorial, on which the queen is depicted in a seated position. Work began in March 1899, when the Hove Borough Surveyor gave permission for the concrete foundations to be laid.

Because it was intended to commemorate Victoria's diamond jubilee, the statue has been described as "the one tangible reminder of [the] jubilee in Hove". This jubilee had been celebrated in an unexpectedly muted way in Hove, with little in the way of special events, illuminations, bunting or similar, although there was a special service at All Saints Church and a procession followed by a sports day event at Hove recreation ground.

The statue was unveiled a week after Victoria's funeral on a "great day of mourning", according to the mayoress of Hove. The ceremony was kept simple out of respect for the late queen. A wreath was laid on behalf of the women of the town. The programme for the day was printed with a black mourning border and noted that there would be no speeches or "the popular demonstrations which are usual on such occasions".

The statue has been cleaned and restored on several occasions, most substantially in 1992 when a specialist firm re-burnished the bronzework and applied a new chemical coating. Vandalism has occurred on several occasions since the 1980s, including paint being thrown over the statue.

== Description ==
The statue stands at the south end of Grand Avenue in the middle of the road, facing the sea, at the opposite end of the street from Hove War Memorial (1921 by Sir Edwin Lutyens). It is in bronze and stands 13 feet (4.0 m) high on an Aberdeen granite plinth which is embellished with four bronze panels. The statue is life-size and depicts Victoria standing in royal regalia, wearing a crown and veil. In her left hand is an orb and in her right a sceptre. The orb is surmounted by a winged Victory, possibly a reference to the statue Napoleon as Mars the Peacemaker in Apsley House, London. She faces south, out to sea. The panels contain low reliefs of allegorical figures which represent commerce, education, science and art, and the British Empire—each captioned in incised lettering in the stonework—advancements made during Victoria's reign. These were added after the original design was complete. The plinth was originally surrounded by four small bollards, one of which has since been lost. An inscription on the plinth at the front reads "Erected by the inhabitants of Hove to commemorate the 60th anniversary of the accession of Queen Victoria June 20 AD 1897". Circling the top of the plinth is a Latin inscription, "Victoria dei gra Britanniae Regina fidei defensor in imperatix" ("Victory of God, Queen of Britain, defender of the faith and the empire").

The front relief (the south side of the monument), Empire, is the most detailed of the four and is in the best condition. It depicts a female figure of Justice, holding a pair of scales in her right hand and an orb in her left. She is surrounded by figures representing parts of the British Empire—Australia and Canada to the right and India and Africa to the left. The rear (north) relief, Science and Art, depicts a woman embracing a child who sits on an anvil and holds a machine. Behind the child is another, also holding a machine. On the eastern side is Education, which depicts a mother holding a book and teaching a child to read; behind are three scholars. The western relief is Commerce, in which a merchant is kneeling with his wares spread around him being examined by two men; a third man is examining a vase. The sea is in the background and a galley is depicted with its sails raised.

The four reliefs on the plinth

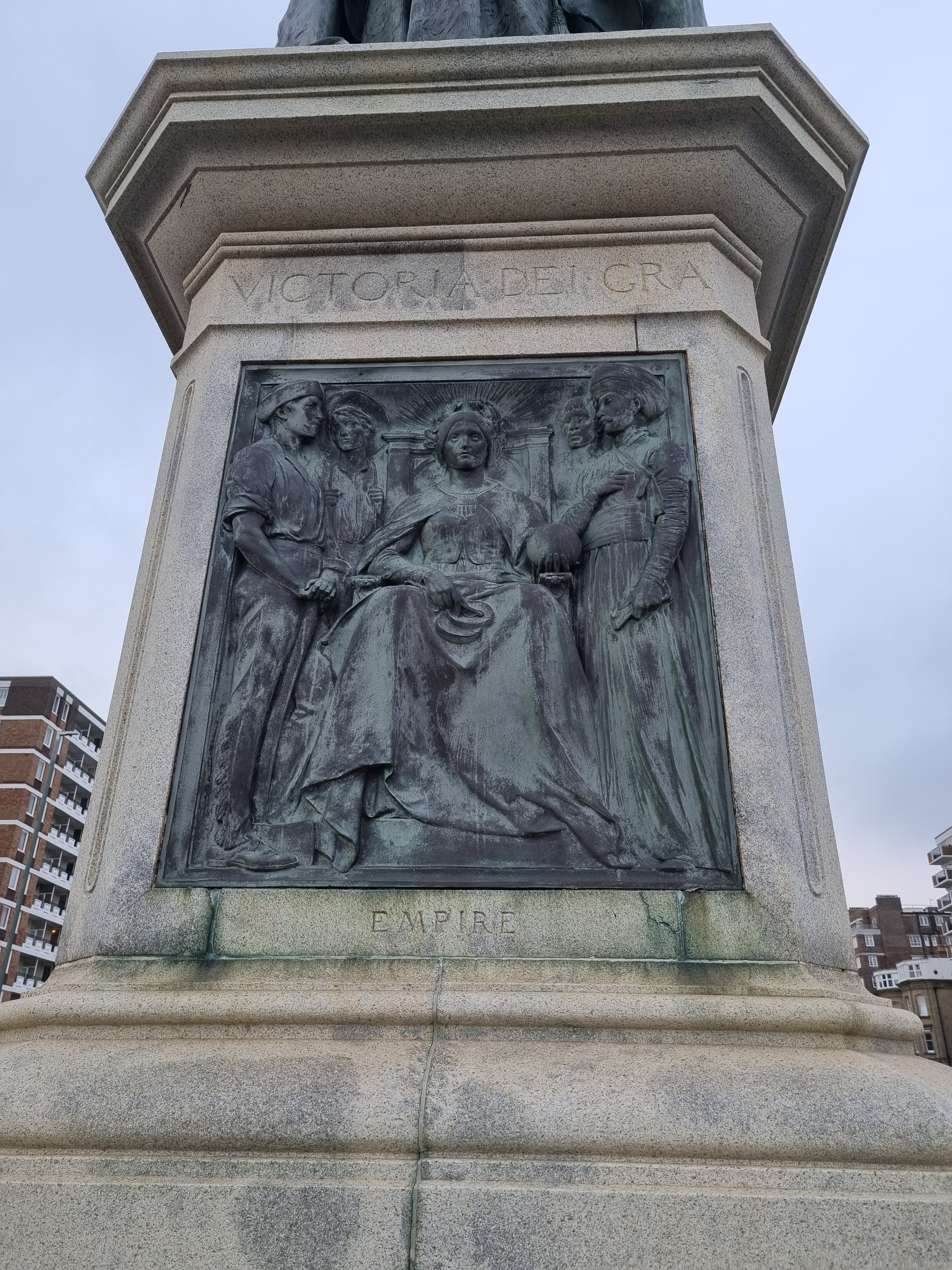
Empire

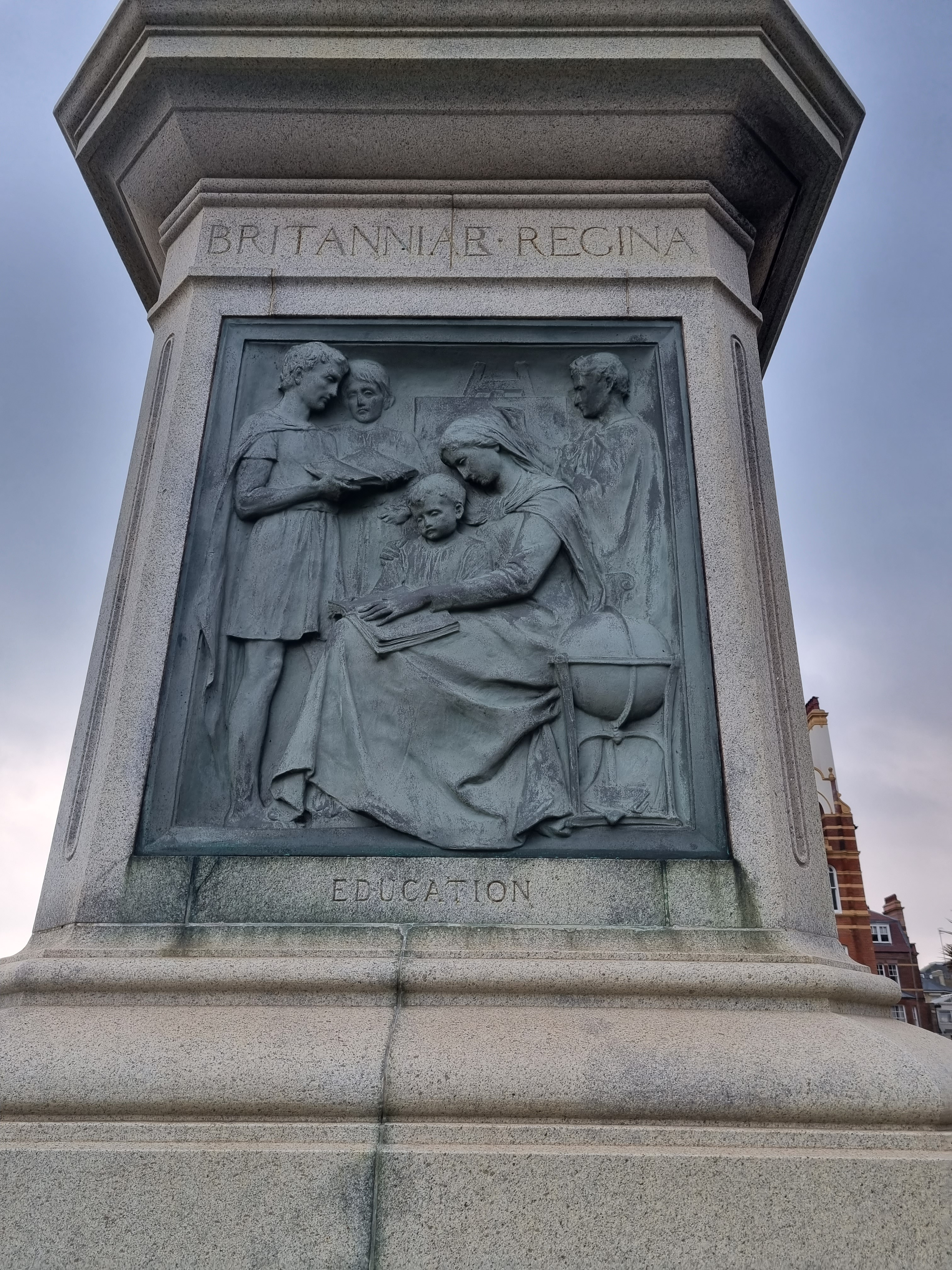
Education

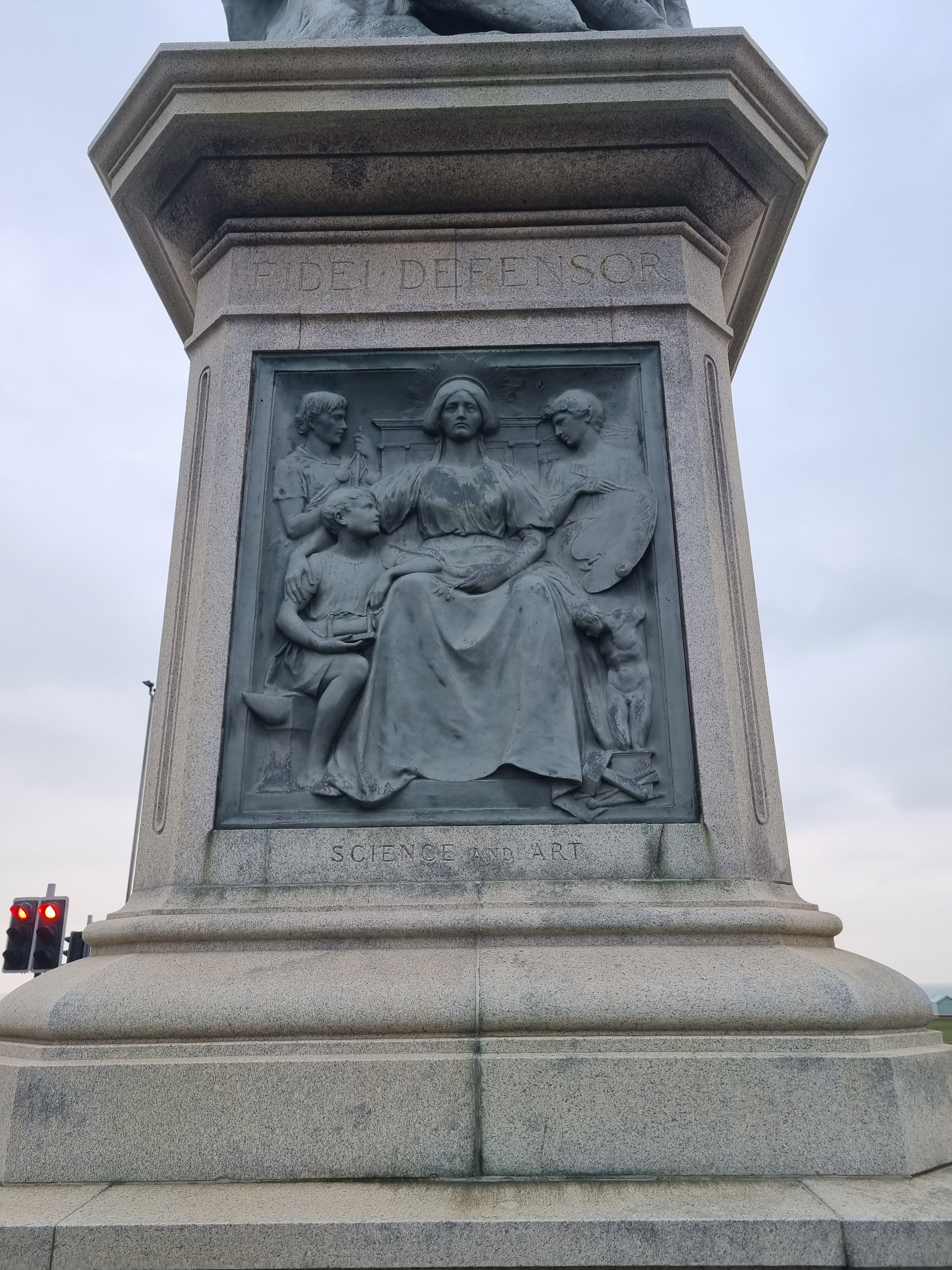
Science and Art

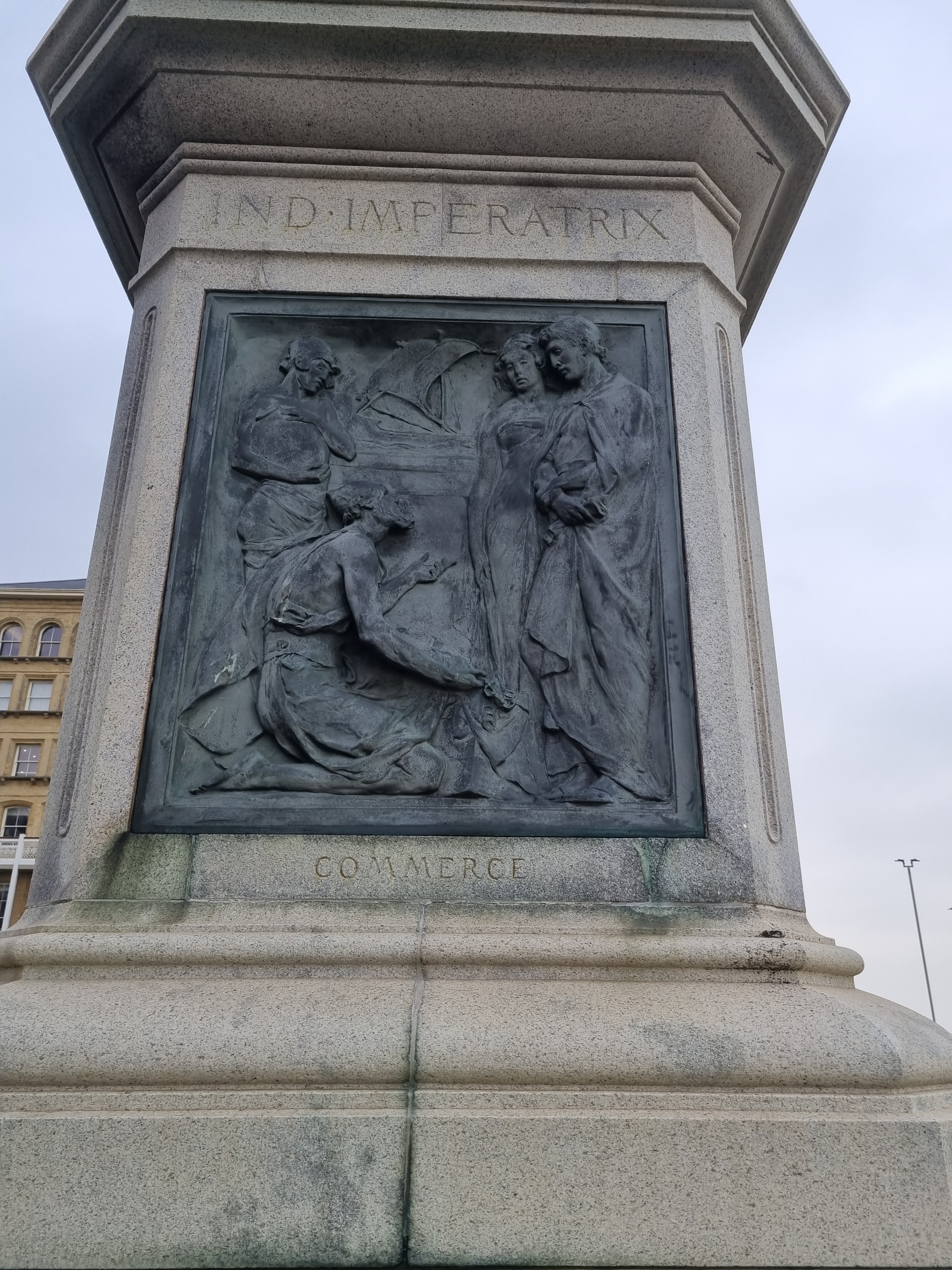
Commerce

== See also ==
- Statue of Queen Victoria, Brighton (1897)
- Peace Statue, Brighton (1912), another nearby royal monument
- List of public art in Brighton and Hove
- List of statues of Queen Victoria
- Grade II listed buildings in Brighton and Hove: S
