= Hove Library =

Public library in Hove, West Sussex, England

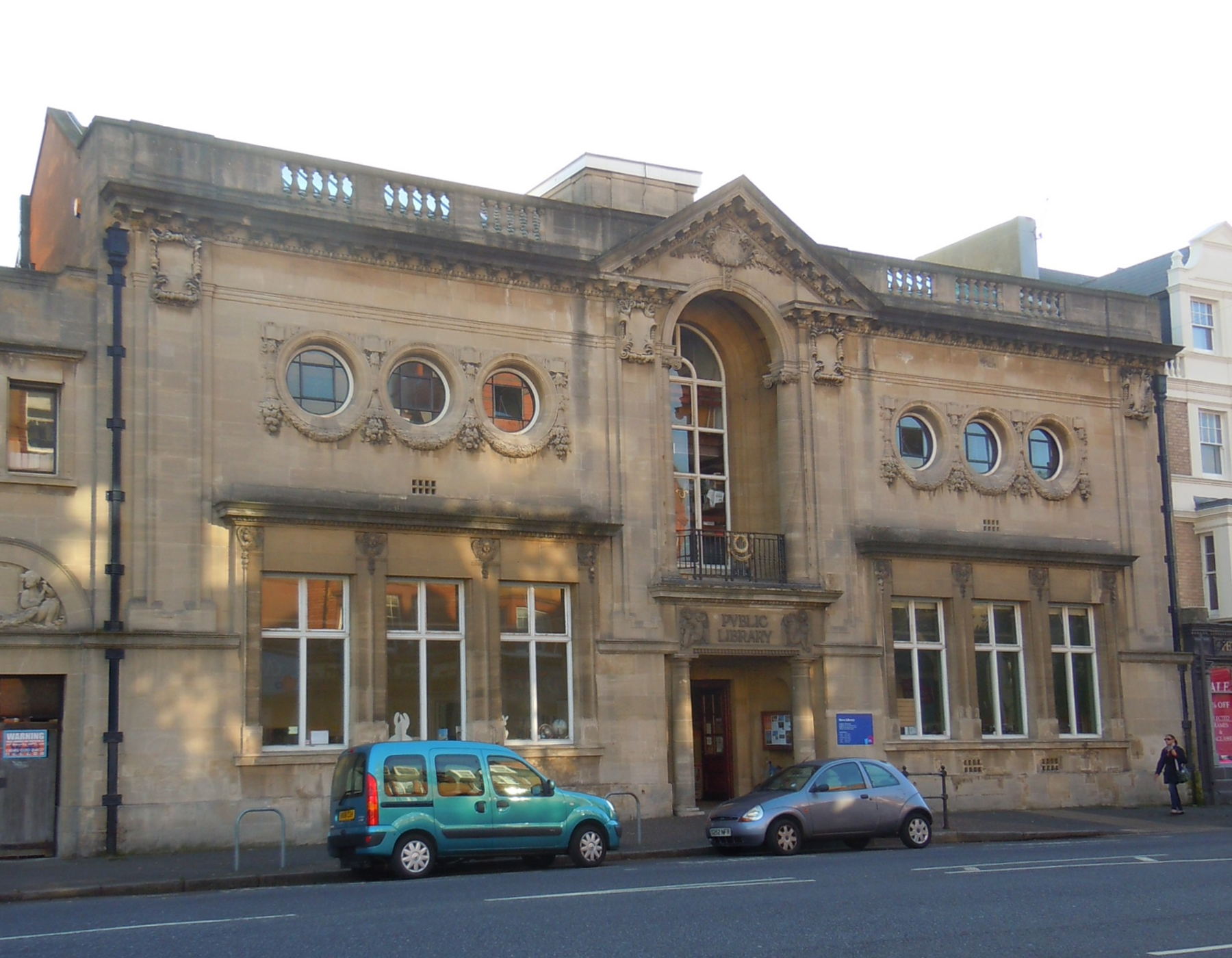
- The library from the north-northeast
- 50.8284°N 0.1771°W
- Location: 182–186 Church Road, Hove BN3 2EG, United Kingdom
- Type: Public library
- Established: December 14, 1891 (original site); July 8, 1908 (present site)
- Architects: Percy Robinson and W. Alban Jones
- Branch of: Brighton & Hove Libraries

Access and use
- Access requirements: None

Other information
- Director: Sally McMahon (Head of Libraries)
- Website: Hove Library Home Page

Hove Library is a public lending library serving Hove, part of the English city of Brighton and Hove. The "highly inventive" Edwardian Baroque/Renaissance Revival-style building, a Carnegie library designed by the architects Percy Robinson and W. Alban Jones of Leeds, opened in 1908 on Church Road, succeeding a library founded in 1890 in a house on the nearby Grand Avenue. The building has been listed at Grade II by Historic England for its architectural and historical importance.

== History ==
=== Grand Avenue and Third Avenue ===
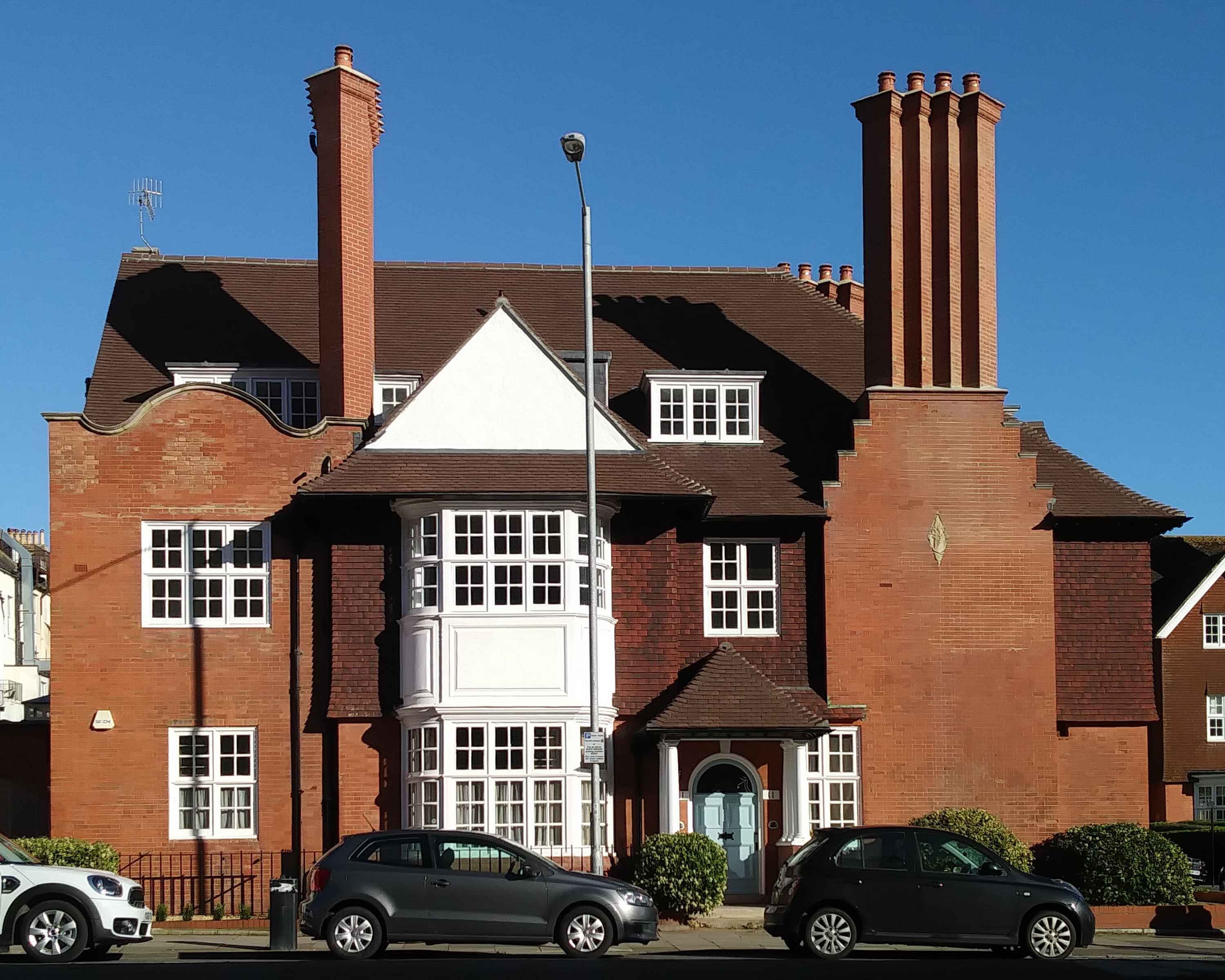
Hove's first library occupied 11 Grand Avenue between 1891 and 1901.

Hove, immediately west of the fashionable resort of Brighton, grew rapidly during the Victorian era: there were a few hundred residents in the 1830s, about 9,000 by 1861, and more than 36,000 by 1901. It became an urban district in 1894 and was incorporated as a municipal borough four years later. Rapid housing development was matched by a generous provision of public buildings: schools, dispensaries, hospitals, churches and a town hall. In April 1890 the forerunner of Hove Borough Council, the Hove Commissioners, set up a committee to investigate how to establish a free library in Hove. Their view was that premises should be rented, as constructing a purpose-built library would be too expensive. The requirements of the Public Libraries Act meant residents had to vote on "the desirability of establishing a public library", and a ballot took place in late March 1891. A majority of residents were in favour. (Note: The commissioners sent out 2,365 voting papers. Of these, 1,197 came back in favour, 502 opposed the scheme, 167 papers were ineligible and 499 were not returned.)

By November 1891 the commissioners had put aside £500 for the scheme, and William Willett was offering to rent the house at 11 Grand Avenue for £100 per year, rising to £150 in the third year. The £500 would not cover purchasing books, so the commissioners asked wealthy residents to donate material. By the following month there was enough stock for the library to be opened, initially as a reading room only and with a caretaker rather than a full-time librarian (one was appointed in January 1892 though). Lending facilities began on 24 October 1892. As well as a wide range of books and periodicals, such as complete sets of Punch, the Encyclopædia Britannica and the Imperial Gazetteer of England and Wales, collectors of curiosities and artworks such as Constantine Alexander Ionides had lent or donated various items such as reproductions of works by Michelangelo and Raphael, a disembowelling knife, a Japanese executioner's sword and a set of assegai spears.

The library was immediately popular: by 1893 there were nearly 600 members, a reference library was created in January 1894, and the opening hours were extended to 11 hours per day with half-day closing on Fridays. By 1900 the hired premises were no longer suitable because of overcrowding and the sheer weight of books, and the borough council formed a committee to investigate whether a permanent library should be built. In the interim, a larger building was hired at 22 Third Avenue, and Hove Library moved there from 23 June 1901.

=== Church Road ===
The library committee—apparently without the knowledge of the wider borough council—approached Andrew Carnegie, who was known for funding many libraries in Britain and abroad, for assistance in 1903. Carnegie agreed to donate £10,000 towards a permanent library building if a site could be found and purchased without a surcharge on the rates and subject to the principles of the Free Public Libraries Act. The site of a council depot on the south side of Church Road, already owned by the council but not yet fully paid for, was identified in that year, and after some difficulties it was chosen in March 1905. The depot was demolished later that year, and an architectural competition was held to find a suitable design for the library. Of the 71 entries, ten were shortlisted and were scrutinised by RIBA president John Belcher. The design submitted by Percy Robinson and W. Alban Jones of Leeds was the winner, and the plans were signed off by the council in October 1906.

After initial works started in February 1907, the foundation stone was laid on 10 June 1907 by the Mayor of Hove, Alderman Bruce Morison. F.G. Minter was the building contractor, having offered the cheapest bid (£9,999) during the tendering process; overall, construction cost £13,500. The new library was opened by Margaret Child Villiers, Countess of Jersey, on 8 July 1908. The two-storey building had a roof garden on the upper floor, to which a glazed screen was added c. 1913. A juvenile library was added in 1920 by converting the basement, and by that year nine staff were employed. Meanwhile, wealthy residents continued to donate thousands of volumes—including many rarities—to the library, along with various artworks and curiosities (all of which were moved to the new Hove Museum at nearby Brooker Hall when that opened in 1927).

The old roof garden was replaced in 1925 by the Wolseley Room, named in memory of Field Marshal Garnet Wolseley, 1st Viscount Wolseley and paid for by his daughter Frances Garnet Wolseley, 2nd Viscountess Wolseley. It was used both for the display of artworks and as a storage and viewing facility for deeds and manorial rolls relating to Sussex parishes. These have been moved to other facilities, but there is still a repository of Wolseley family papers. Money was left to Hove Borough Council to maintain the facility, and the room was refurbished in 1970.

Abortive plans in the 1960s included an eastward extension of the library building (a project curtailed by the destruction of Hove Town Hall in a fire in 1966 and the need to rebuild it) and the opening of a branch library near St Thomas the Apostle's Church in the north of Hove. In December 1983, the contents of Hove's separate music library were integrated into the main library. Hove Music Library had opened a short distance along Church Road from the main library in March 1966. Major refurbishment work was carried out in 1988–89, and the library was awarded Grade II listed status on 2 November 1992.

== Architecture ==
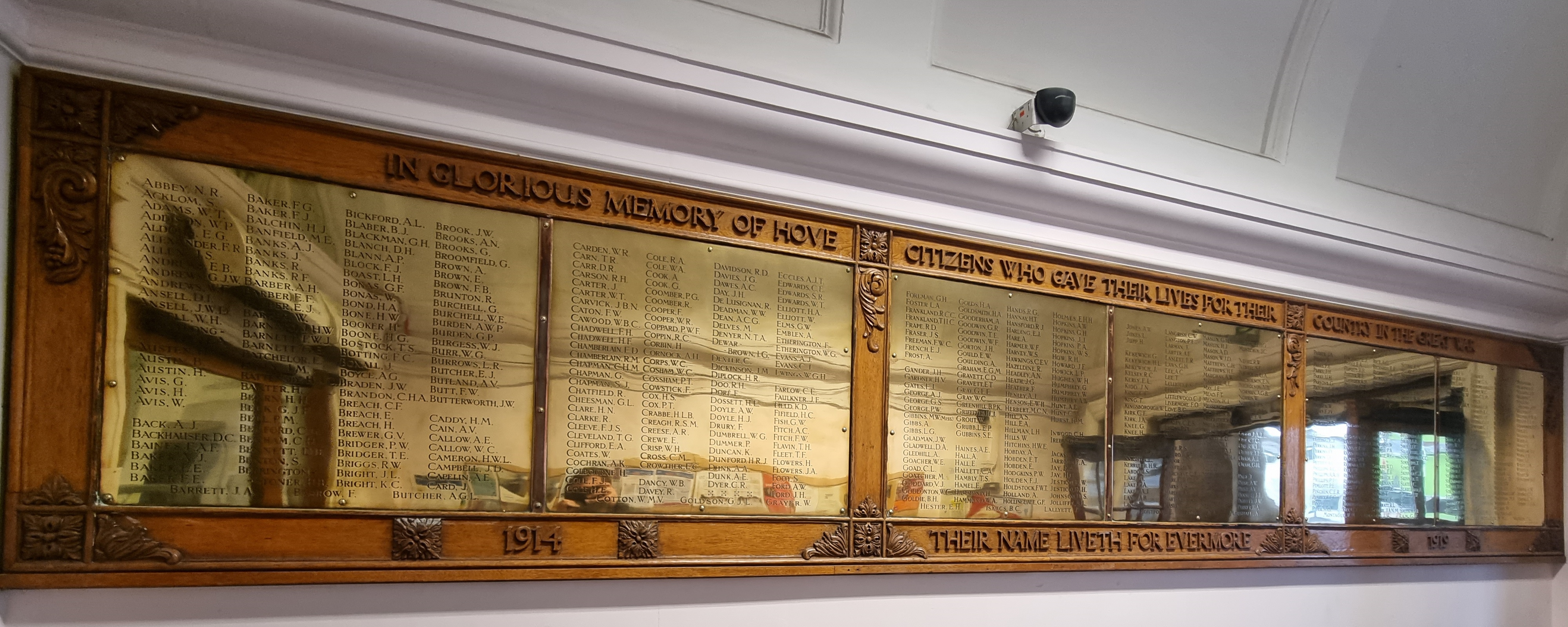
There are war memorial plaques inside the entrance to the library.

Architecturally, the façade of Hove Library, designed in 1907 and executed between 1907 and 1908, has been described as "very much of its time" and "one of the most attractive" among "the many public libraries erected in the years prior to World War I". The style has been called Edwardian Classical Revival, Renaissance, Edwardian Baroque and "Wrenaissance" (another term for Edwardian Baroque, referring to its associations with the architecture of Christopher Wren). Other Wrenaissance-style local buildings of this era include Ralli Hall in Hove and 163 North Street, Brighton. Comparisons have also been drawn with the works of architect Edwin Lutyens, active at the time.

The "highly inventive" building is of two storeys and is built of honey-coloured ashlar Doulting stone. The roof is hidden behind a parapet with a balustrade. Below this, centrally placed, is an open pediment with elaborate carvings and a dentil cornice, which continues across the width of the façade below the parapet. Below the pediment is a tall, deeply recessed round-arched opening. At ground-floor level, flanking the Ionic-columned recessed entrance, there are groups of three tall straight-headed windows separated by pilasters and set below prominent entablatures with egg-and-dart moulding and decorative capitals in the form of cherubs' heads. At first-floor level are groups of three round windows with similarly elaborate moulded decoration consisting of garlands and swags. The roof was originally topped with a cupola, but it was removed as structurally unsound in 1967.

An "impressive glass dome" lights the interior, which has been described as "spatially interesting". The entrance hall opens into an octagonal hallway and then beyond into the circular library (above which sat the roof garden). To the right (west) is a reading room; to the east, subsidiary rooms and the staircase leading to the upper storey, from which the highly ornamented dome is visible. There is ornate plasterwork here and in the rotunda above the circular library. Inside the entrance hallway are a series of brass plaques bearing the names of Hove men who died on active service during World Wars I and II, as the town's war memorial on Grand Avenue does not have names.

Grade II listed status, awarded in 1992, is given to "nationally important buildings of special interest". As of February 2001, it was one of 1,124 Grade II-listed buildings and structures, and 1,218 listed buildings of all grades, in the city of Brighton and Hove.

== Administration ==
Hove Library was administered by Hove Borough Council until 1 April 1974, when in accordance with the Local Government Act 1972 it came under the control of East Sussex County Council. From 1 April 1997 it became the responsibility of the newly formed unitary authority of Brighton and Hove, now known as Brighton and Hove City Council. The building is now open seven hours per day except Wednesdays (nine hours) and Sundays (closed) and has a café and a range of computer equipment.

== See also ==
- Grade II listed buildings in Brighton and Hove: E–H
- Libraries in Brighton and Hove
- List of Carnegie libraries in Europe

== Bibliography ==
- Antram, Nicholas; Morrice, Richard (2008). Brighton and Hove. Pevsner Architectural Guides. London: Yale University Press. ISBN 978-0-300-12661-7.
- Antram, Nicholas; Pevsner, Nikolaus (2013). Sussex: East with Brighton and Hove. The Buildings of England. London: Yale University Press. ISBN 978-0-300-18473-0.
- Brighton Polytechnic. School of Architecture and Interior Design (1987). A Guide to the Buildings of Brighton. Macclesfield: McMillan Martin. ISBN 1-869865-03-0.
- Middleton, Judy (1979). A History of Hove. Chichester: Phillimore & Co. ISBN 0-85033-325-3.
- Middleton, Judy (2002). The Encyclopaedia of Hove & Portslade. Brighton: Brighton & Hove Libraries.
