= Fordham War Memorial =

WWI memorial in Cambridgeshire, England

- United Kingdom
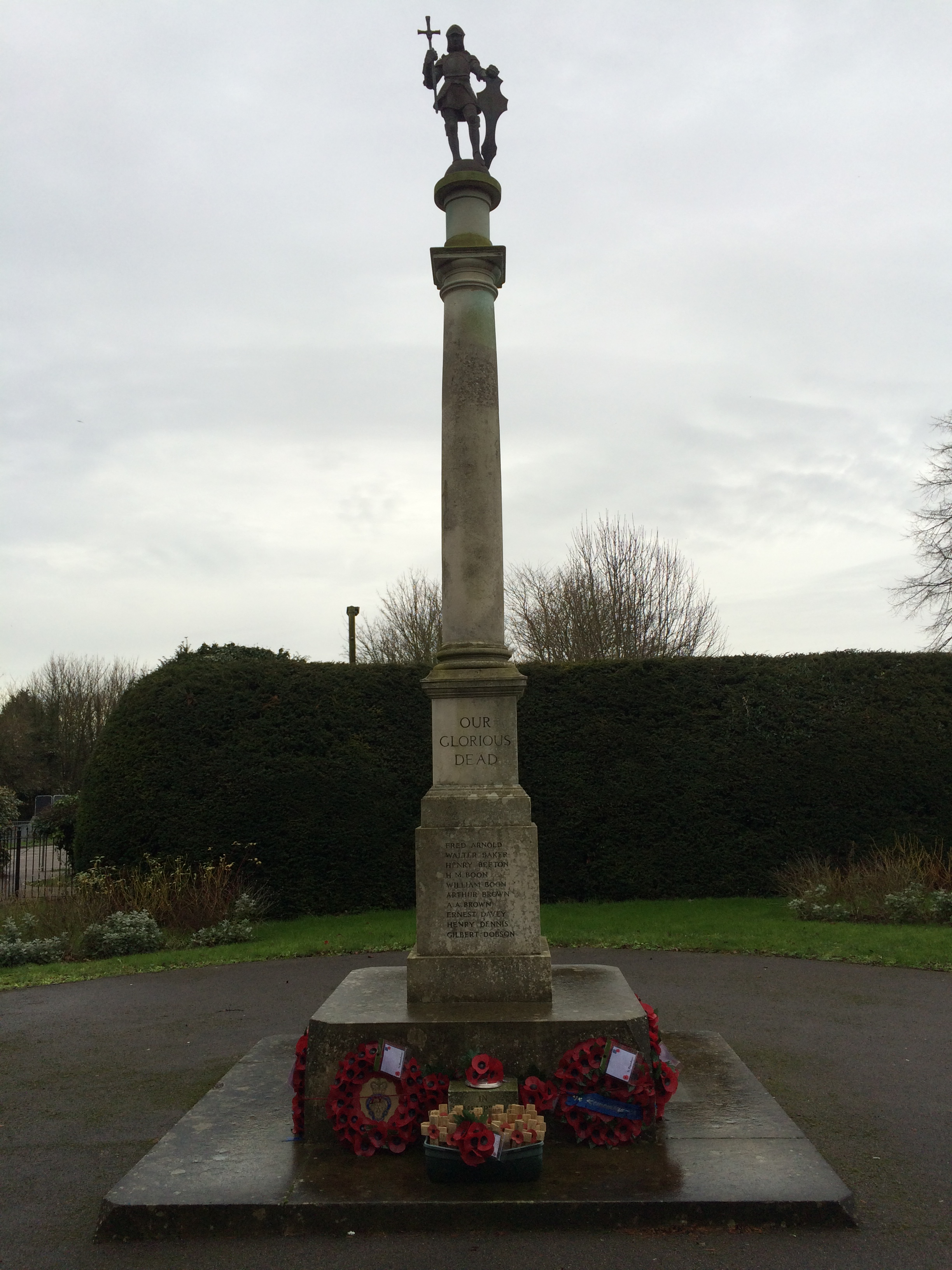
- For men from Fordham killed in the First World War
- Unveiled: 7 August 1921
- Location: 52.311466°N 0.39055°E; Carter Street, Fordham, Cambridgeshire near Ely (Cambs)/Newmarket (Suffolk)
- Designed by: Sir Edwin Lutyens/George Frampton

Listed Building – Grade II
- Official name: Fordham War Memorial
- Designated: 31 January 1984
- Reference no.: 1331743

Fordham War Memorial is a First World War memorial in the village of Fordham in Cambridgeshire in eastern England. The memorial was designed by Sir Edwin Lutyens with sculpture by Sir George Frampton and closely resembles Hove War Memorial in East Sussex, which was also a collaboration between Lutyens and Frampton. It was unveiled in 1921 and is today a grade II listed building.

== Background ==
In the aftermath of the First World War and its unprecedented casualties, thousands of war memorials were built across Britain. Amongst the most prominent designers of memorials was the architect Sir Edwin Lutyens, described by Historic England as "the leading English architect of his generation". Lutyens designed the Cenotaph on Whitehall in London, which became the focus for the national Remembrance Sunday commemorations, as well as the Thiepval Memorial to the Missing—the largest British war memorial anywhere in the world—and the Stone of Remembrance which appears in all large Commonwealth War Graves Commission cemeteries and in several of Lutyens's civic war memorials. Fordam's memorial is unusual among Lutyens' works in that it features a bronze statue of Saint George, a feature shared only with Hove War Memorial in East Sussex.

As in many places, a war memorial committee was established in Fordham in June 1919 to decide on commemoration of the village's dead. The committee initially favoured a proposal for a memorial portico at the entrance to the village cemetery, which would contain tablets engraved with the names of the dead. This proposal was shelved when a Mrs Dunn-Gardner from Fordham Abbey donated a five-acre plot of land in a central area of the village for use as a park and a setting for a war memorial, and the committee commissioned Lutyens to design a monument to fit the space. While many of Lutyens' commissions for war memorials originated from friends or former clients in the area, it does not appear that the architect had any prior connection to Fordham.

== History and design ==
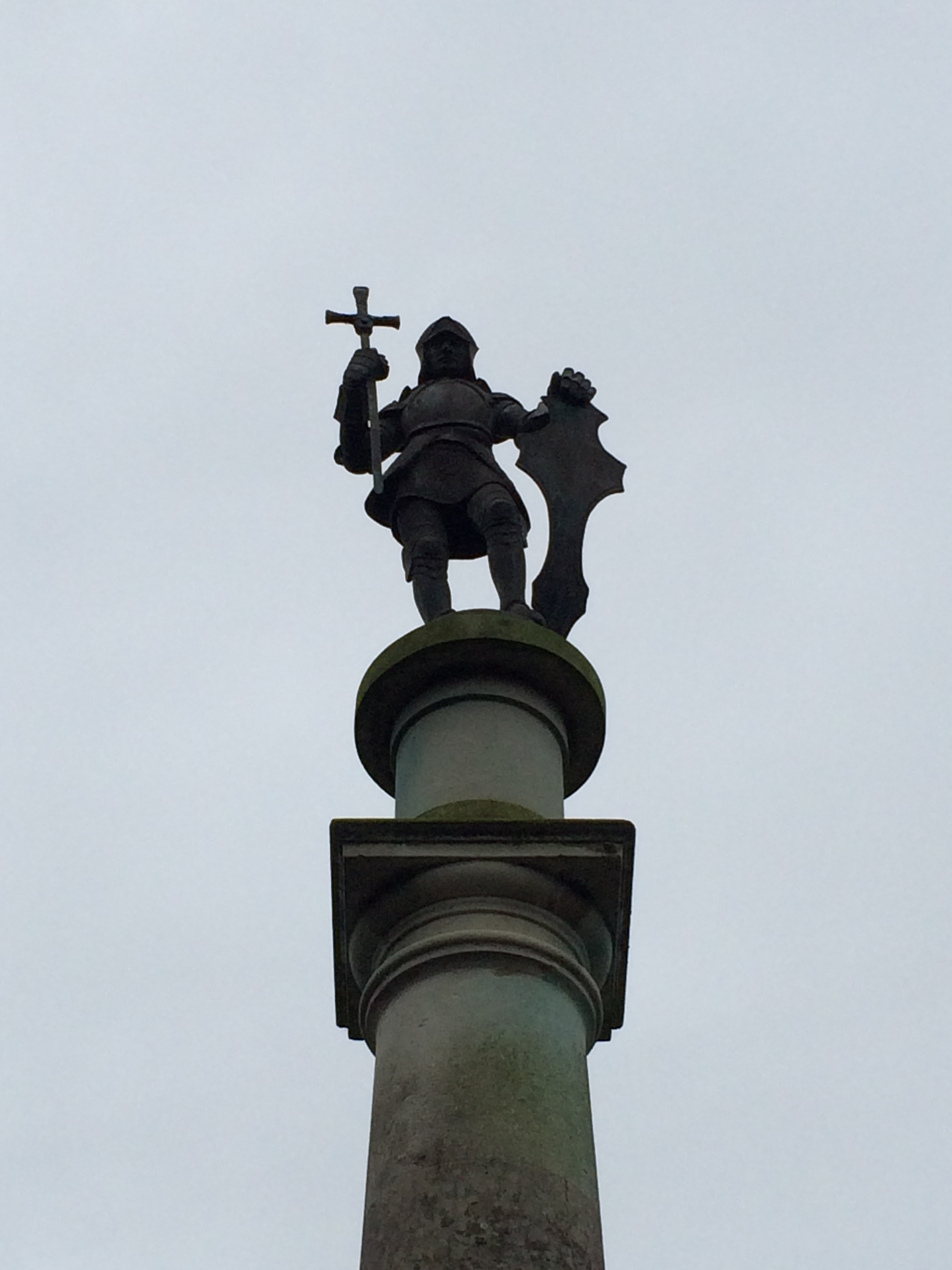
Close-up of the fibreglass replacement statue; the bronze original was stolen in 1991.

Lutyens designed a Doric column in Portland stone surmounted by a bronze statue of Saint George, sculpted by Sir George Frampton. At the bottom of the column is a plinth of two square blocks and a base of two further square blocks, taking the memorial to a total height of six metres (20 feet). The upper section of the plinth contains the memorial's dedication: "OUR GLORIOUS DEAD" on the south side and the dates of the First World War in Roman numerals on the west and east. The names of the village's dead are inscribed on all four sections of the lower plinth, to which the names of the dead from the Second World War were added at a later date.

The construction work was undertaken by Frank Johnson, a local builder and stonemason. It was unveiled by Mrs Dunn-Gardner on 7 August 1921. In June 1991 the memorial was severely damaged by thieves, who partially demolished the column and stole the bronze statue in what author Tim Skelton described as "the most wanton act of vandalism to a Lutyens war memorial". The thieves were never caught and the community raised £4,750 for repair of the column and a replacement statue, made from fibreglass by artist Robert Donaldson based on photographs of the original.

Lutyens adapted the design for a proposal for a war memorial in Shere in Surrey, but the memorial committee there opted for a different architect and design. Fordham War Memorial was designated a grade II listed building on 31 January 1984. In March 2015, as part of commemorations for the centenary of the First World War, Lutyens' war memorials were recognised as a "national collection" and all of his free-standing memorials in England were listed or had their listing status reviewed and their National Heritage List for England list entries were updated and expanded.

== See also ==
- Mells War Memorial, in Somerset, also features a statue of Saint George but in marble
