= Hove War Memorial =

1921 sculpture by Edwin Lutyens

- United Kingdom
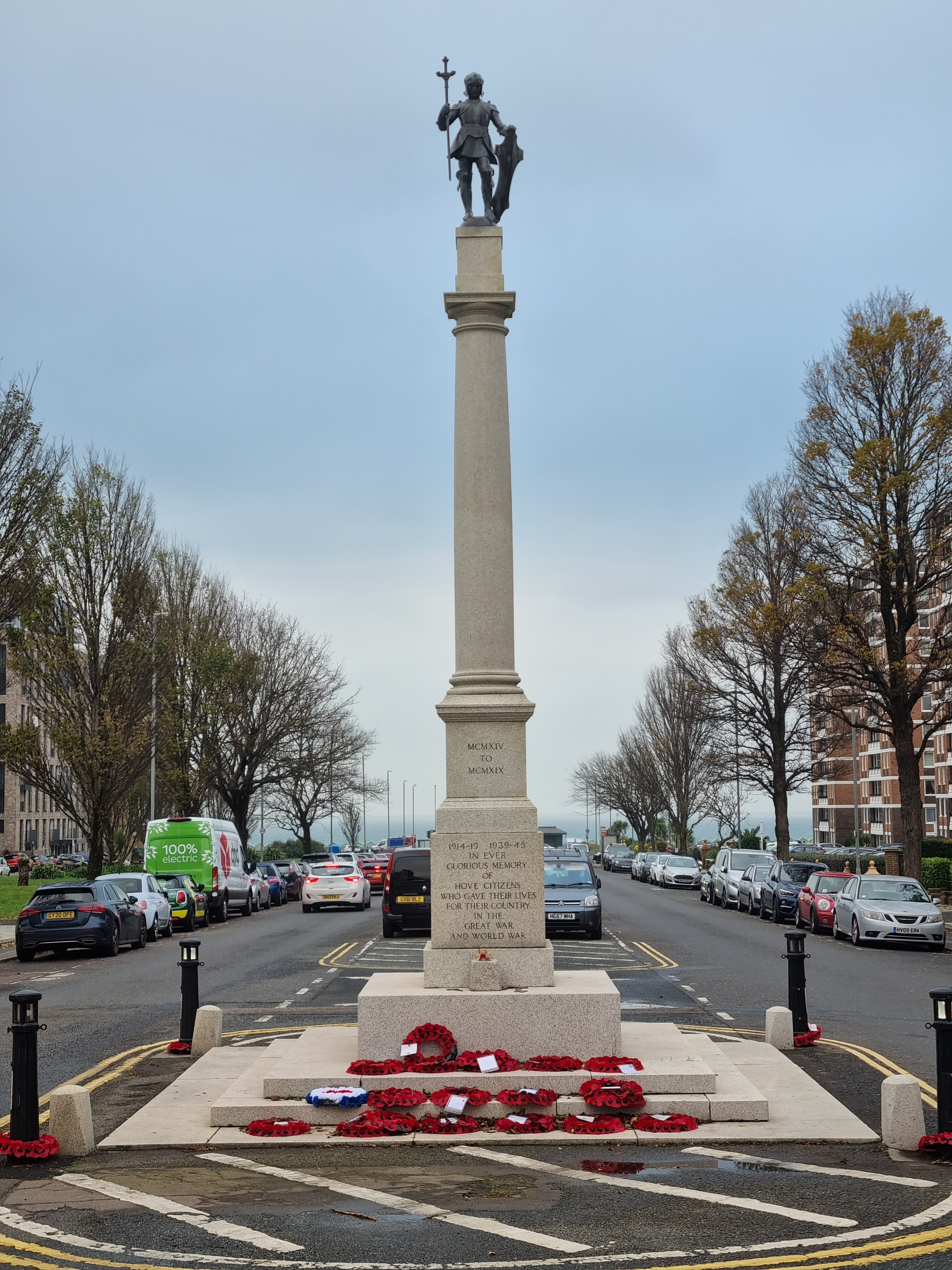
- The memorial in 2022
- For men from Hove killed in the First World War
- Unveiled: 27 February 1921
- Location: 50°49′37″N 0°10′07″W; Grand Avenue, Hove, East Sussex
- Designed by: Sir Edwin Lutyens

Listed Building – Grade II
- Official name: Hove War Memorial
- Designated: 2 November 1992
- Reference no.: 1187556

Hove War Memorial is a First World War memorial designed by Sir Edwin Lutyens and located on Grand Avenue in Hove, part of the city of Brighton and Hove, on the south coast of England. Hove was the site of one of the earliest recruiting events at the beginning of the war and later of several military hospitals. Over 600 men from the town were killed during the war, a quarter of them from the local regiment alone. A war memorial committee was established in 1919 and Lutyens was engaged as architect. A design was agreed in 1920 after two unsuccessful proposals; Lutyens chose the site from several options.

Lutyens designed a Tuscan column on a three-staged base, topped with a statue of Saint George, patron saint of England. George, cast in the studio of Sir George Frampton, holds a sword by the blade in one hand and a shield in the other. The same statue, with variations, appears on several of Frampton's other monuments, including Fordham War Memorial in Cambridgeshire, also by Lutyens. The base contains several dedicatory inscriptions but no names, which are instead recorded on plaques in the town's library.

The memorial was unveiled on 27 February 1921 by Lord Leconfield; Lutyens, in India, was represented by his office manager. It is a Grade II listed building.

== Background ==
In the aftermath of the First World War and its unprecedented casualties, thousands of war memorials were built across Britain. Amongst the most prominent designers of memorials was the architect Sir Edwin Lutyens, described by Historic England as "the leading English architect of his generation". Lutyens established his reputation designing country houses for wealthy clients around the turn of the twentieth century and later built much of New Delhi, but the war had a profound effect on him. Thereafter, he dedicated much of his time to commemorating its casualties. He became renowned for the Cenotaph in London, which became Britain's national memorial, and for his work for the Imperial War Graves Commission.

Located on the English south coast, Hove was the site of a Royal Navy Volunteer Reserve station prior to the First World War. The establishment grew in importance as war loomed and the Royal Navy's 1st Battle Squadron visited the town in July 1914 at the invitation of the mayor. Hove Town Hall was the scene of one of the first large-scale recruitment events the following month, following Britain's declaration of war on Germany and the subsequent drive to expand the armed forces. Long lines of men from Hove, Portslade, and surrounding areas marched to the hall to enlist and were addressed by the novelist Sir Arthur Conan Doyle. Field hospitals, including one at the Brighton, Hove and Sussex Grammar School in the town, were established along the south coast to care for injured servicemen evacuated from France. Other schools and large buildings were similarly taken over, and the local cottage hospital treated nearly 900 men over the course of the war. The town also hosted several Belgian refugee families and a contingent of German prisoners of war. Over 600 men from Hove died in the war, of whom 163 were serving with the local regiment, the Royal Sussex.

== Commissioning ==
The proposal for a war memorial in Hove first appeared in the vestry notes section of a local newspaper. As in many places, a war memorial committee was formed to handle the town's commemorations and raise funds, beginning its work in January 1919. There were calls from within the community for a functional memorial, such as a meeting hall—which would be of benefit to the living—rather than a decorative monument. By May, the committee had decided to allocate a minority of its funds to a decorative memorial, the rest to be used for practical purposes such as grants for war widows and orphans. They chose Lutyens to design the monument, desiring an eminent architect. Lutyens' first proposal was for a cenotaph and he built a wooden model for public exhibition on the sea front. This was rejected by public opinion, as was his next proposal, for an obelisk. The successful design, for a statue and column, was agreed in March 1920. The committee's first choice of location was Palmeira Gardens but the landowner refused permission, leaving the committee with three sites on Grand Avenue. In June 1920, Lutyens visited Hove and chose a site in the middle of the road, near its northern end and parallel to the statue of Queen Victoria at the southern end. Lutyens designed dozens of war memorials across England, though Hove's was his only one in Sussex. Many war memorials were delayed by local disagreements or fundraising problems, but Hove's proceeded relatively smoothly once the design was agreed. The project was among the first of Lutyens' to be completed.

== Design ==
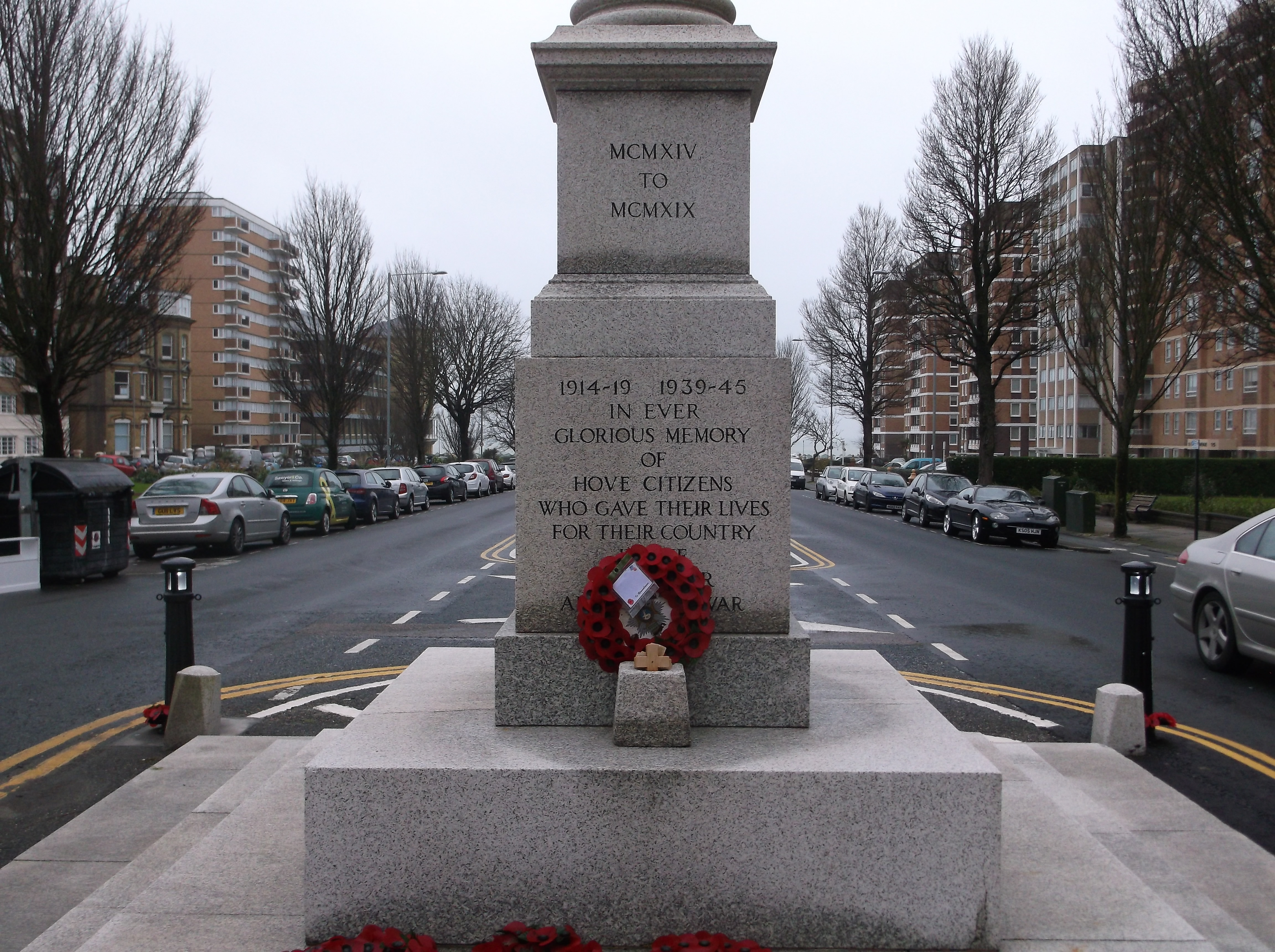
The lower sections of the memorial, showing the inscriptions, partially obscured by a poppy wreath laid at a remembrance service

The memorial consists of a bronze statue of Saint George atop a stone column. The statue wears Renaissance-style armour and holds a sword by the blade below the hilt in his right hand, and a shield in his left. The figure was a modified version of a generic design from Sir George Frampton's studio, though there is no evidence that the sculptor was personally involved. Saint George stands on a plinth at the top of a Tuscan column. At the bottom of the column is a two-staged square dado (the middle section), which contains the inscriptions, and below that is a base of two square stone blocks. The whole memorial stands on three shallow stone steps, taking the memorial to a total height of 10 metres (33 feet). At the corners of the bottom step are low stone bollards, part of the original design; next to these are metal lamp pillars, which are a modern addition.

The main inscription is on the north face:

IN EVER GLORIOUS MEMORY OF HOVE CITIZENS WHO GAVE THEIR LIVES FOR THEIR COUNTRY IN THE GREAT WAR AND WORLD WAR

The dates of the wars are inscribed above the dedication. The south face bears the phrase "Their name liveth for evermore", a biblical quote (from Ecclesiasticus chapter 44, verse 14) suggested to Lutyens by Rudyard Kipling and which appears on many of Lutyens' memorials. The dates of the First and Second World Wars are inscribed in Roman numerals on each face higher on the plinth: "MCMXIV TO MCMXIX" (1914–1919) on the north and south faces and "MCMXXXIX TO MCMXLV" (1939–1945) on the east and west. The inscriptions relating to the Second World War were added after that conflict. No names are listed on the memorial. Instead, 631 names were embossed on a series of brass plaques, which were framed in oak and mounted in the entrance to Hove Library.

Columns were fairly unusual as First World War memorials in Britain. Where they were topped with a sculpture, allegorical figures such as Victory were the usual choice, but several memorial committees chose Saint George, the patron saint of England and of soldiers. Variations of Frampton's template appear in several places, the first (a Boer War memorial) at Radley College, Oxfordshire. Another stands in Maidstone in Kent, and Lutyens produced a near-identical design for Fordham War Memorial in Cambridgeshire, unveiled the same year as Hove's. All bear some resemblance to the statues of David by the Renaissance sculptor Donatello. Saint George was traditionally used to embody traditions of bravery, chivalry, and honour, which were also applied to Britain's war dead.

A Guide to the Buildings of Brighton calls the memorial an "elegant and restrained homage to citizens of Hove who died during the First World War" and Historic England describes it as "an eloquent witness to the tragic impacts of world events on this community". Alasdair Glass, in an article for the Regency Society of Brighton and Hove, compared it unfavourably to the nearby Lewes War Memorial. Glass described the column as "unimpressive" and "diminished by its setting in the yawning void of Grand Avenue" and the statue as "formulaic and lacking originality" given its similarity to other works by Frampton. Glass also criticised the positioning of Saint George with his back to the sea, compared to Lewes's, which faces east towards the battlefields. The art historian Geoff Archer points out that Frampton was too old to have fought in the First World War and it is "therefore unsurprising that [he] would have recourse to the well-tried iconography of the mythical hero", whereas younger sculptors with personal experience of the war tended to prefer greater realism.

== History ==
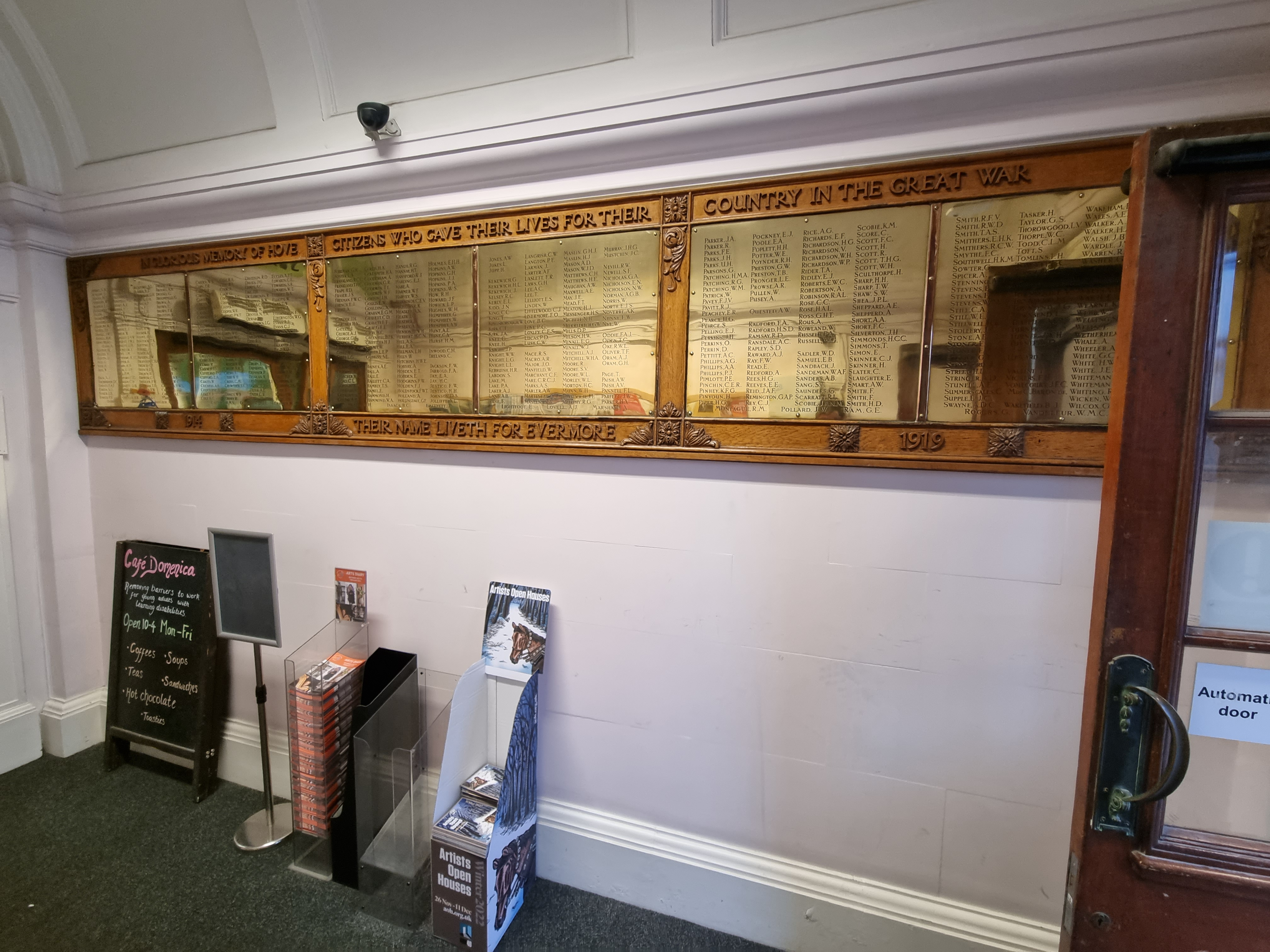
The names of Hove's war dead are embossed on brass plaques which are mounted in the entrance to the town's library.

The total cost of the memorial was £1,537 (1920). It was unveiled on 27 February 1921 by Charles Wyndham, 3rd Baron Leconfield, the Lord Lieutenant of Sussex, 11 months after the newspaper article which prompted it. Lutyens was away in India, working on his design for New Delhi, but sent his office manager, A. J. Thomas, in his place. Thousands of local people attended the unveiling ceremony, including 1,000 bereaved relatives. The ceremony concluded with the lowering of flags and four buglers sounding the "Last Post". Members of the public and local organisations laid wreaths and other floral tributes, including Brighton & Hove Albion Football Club, who lost four players and a member of staff during the war. The height of the memorial and the gradient of the road mean that it overlooks the sea and Sir Thomas Brock's statue of Queen Victoria (1901). Its setting was spacious and quiet when it was first built but has since become busy with traffic.

Lutyens adapted the design for a proposal for a war memorial in Shere in Surrey, but the memorial committee there opted for a different architect and design. Hove War Memorial was designated a Grade II listed building on 2 November 1992, meaning it is considered to be of special architectural or historic interest. Listed building status provides legal protection from demolition or unsympathetic modification. In 2015, as part of commemorations for the centenary of the First World War, Lutyens' war memorials were recognised as a national collection and all of his free-standing memorials in England, including Hove's, were listed or had their list entries updated with new research.

== See also ==
- Brighton War Memorial
- Grade II listed buildings in Brighton and Hove: E–H
- List of public art in Brighton and Hove
- List of works by Edwin Lutyens
