= Pruett Mullens Dennett =

British World War I flying ace

- Pruett Mullens Dennett 21 May 1917
- Born: 21 January 1899; New Southgate, Middlesex, England
- Died: 2 June 1918 (aged 19) near Estaires, Nord, France
- Military career
- Allegiance: United Kingdom
- Branch: Royal Navy; Royal Air Force
- Service years: 1917–1918
- Rank: Lieutenant
- Units: No. 8 (Naval) Squadron RNAS, No. 208 Squadron RAF

Lieutenant Pruett Mullens Dennett (21 January 1899 – 2 June 1918) was a World War I British flying ace. He was credited with ten aerial victories, the last occurring on the day he was killed in combat.

== Early life ==
Pruett Mullens Dennett, son of Ralph Mullens Dennett and Ethel Lavinia Gilburd Dennett, was born on 21 January 1899 in New Southgate, Middlesex, England. He was baptised there on 26 February 1899. After his father's death in 1901, his mother remarried and took the surname Sandy. The family resided on Preston Road in Brighton, East Sussex, England.

== Career ==
Pruett Dennett joined the Royal Naval Air Service on 25 March 1917. Flight Officer Dennett received his aviator's certificate on 21 May 1917 on an Avro biplane at the Royal Naval Air Station in Redcar, Yorkshire, England. He received his commission on 27 August 1917 and was posted as a pilot to the No. 8 (Naval) Squadron of the Royal Naval Air Service. It was known as "Naval Eight" to its members. The original squadron was composed of an all-volunteer group of aviators. Dennett was promoted to Flight Sub-Lieutenant of the RNAS in September 1917. With the merger of the Royal Naval Air Service and the Royal Flying Corps on 1 April 1918, his squadron became the No. 208 Squadron of the Royal Air Force. Dennett is credited with ten aerial victories, all of them taking place from a Sopwith Camel, a single-seat biplane. The first six victories occurred as a member of No. 8 Squadron, and the last four after it was renumbered as No. 208 Squadron. His first aerial victory occurred on 6 December 1917 over Hénin-Liétard, Pas-de-Calais, France. Dennett sent an unidentified two-seater out of control. His second took place on 3 January 1918 over Arras, Pas-de-Calais; his Camel (B6447) defeated a Hannover C, which was destroyed. The following day, he defeated a DFW C over Oppy-Monchy, France from his Camel (B6319). On 19 January 1918, Dennett scored a double victory from Camel (B6447). He sent two Albatros D.V aircraft out of control, one over Wingles, Pas-de-Calais and the other over Hénin-Liétard. His sixth victory was another Albatros D.V over Hénin-Liétard, this time from Camel (N6356) on 29 January 1918. More than two months passed until Dennett's next victory. It was with No. 208 Squadron on 17 April 1918. His Camel (D1873) defeated an Albatros D.V, one mile south of Merville, Nord, France. Dennett's eighth occurred on 22 May 1918, two miles northeast of Lens, Pas-de-Calais, and involved an unidentified two-seater that was sent out of control. The lieutenant's ninth victory was on 31 May 1918 over Merville. His Camel (D1854) defeated a Fokker Dr.I triplane which was sent out of control. Pruett Dennett's final victory took place on 2 June 1918, north of Lestrem, Pas-de-Calais. His Sopwith Camel (D1854) destroyed an Albatros D.V.

== Gallery of planes ==
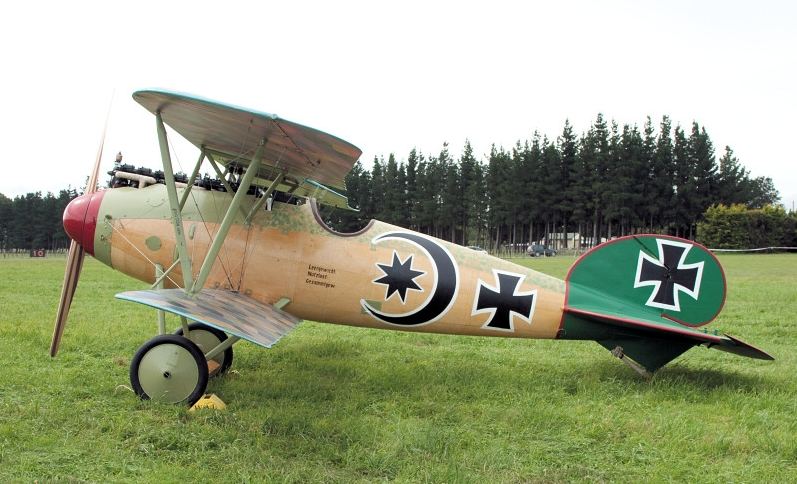
Albatros D.V, five of Dennett's victories, #4-7, 10.

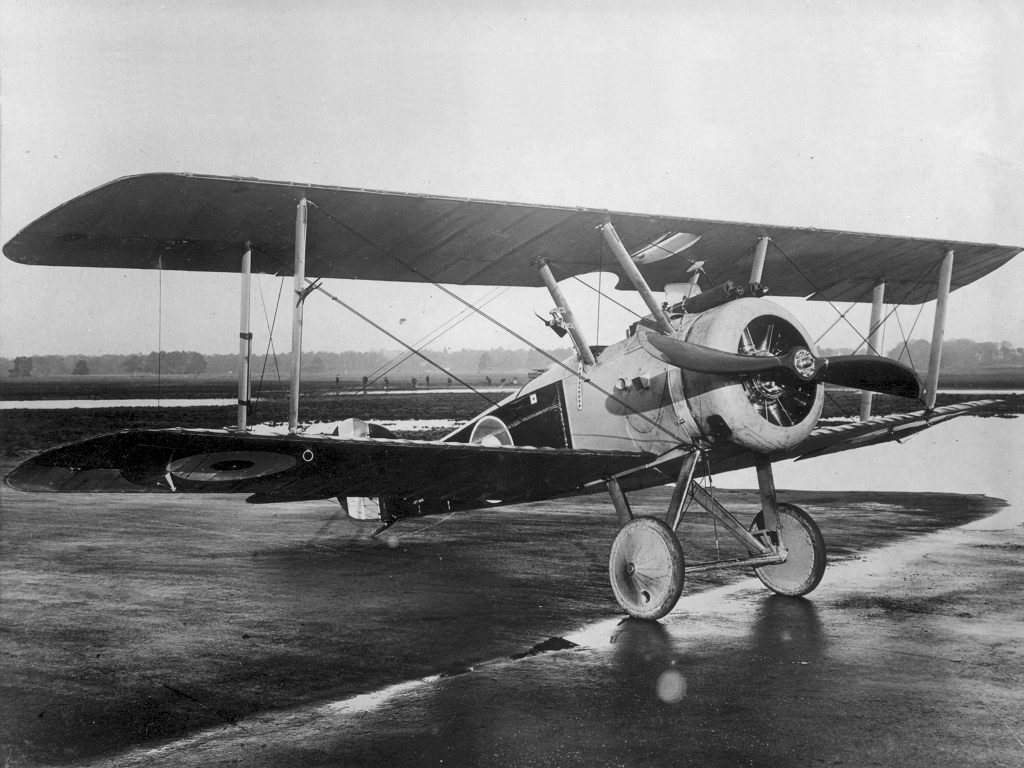
Dennett scored all ten of his victories from a Sopwith Camel.

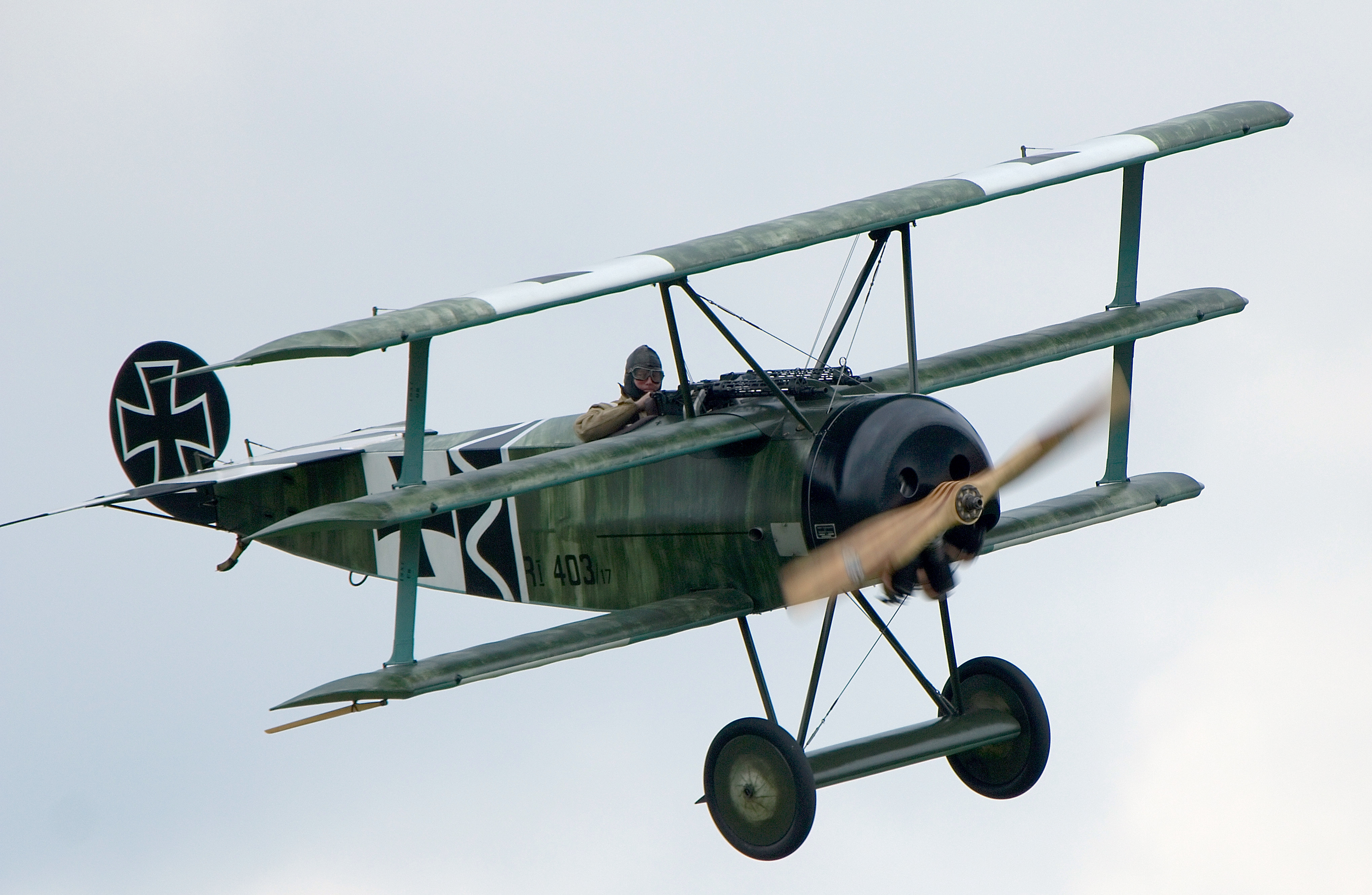
Fokker Dr.I, one of Dennett's victories, #9.

== Death ==
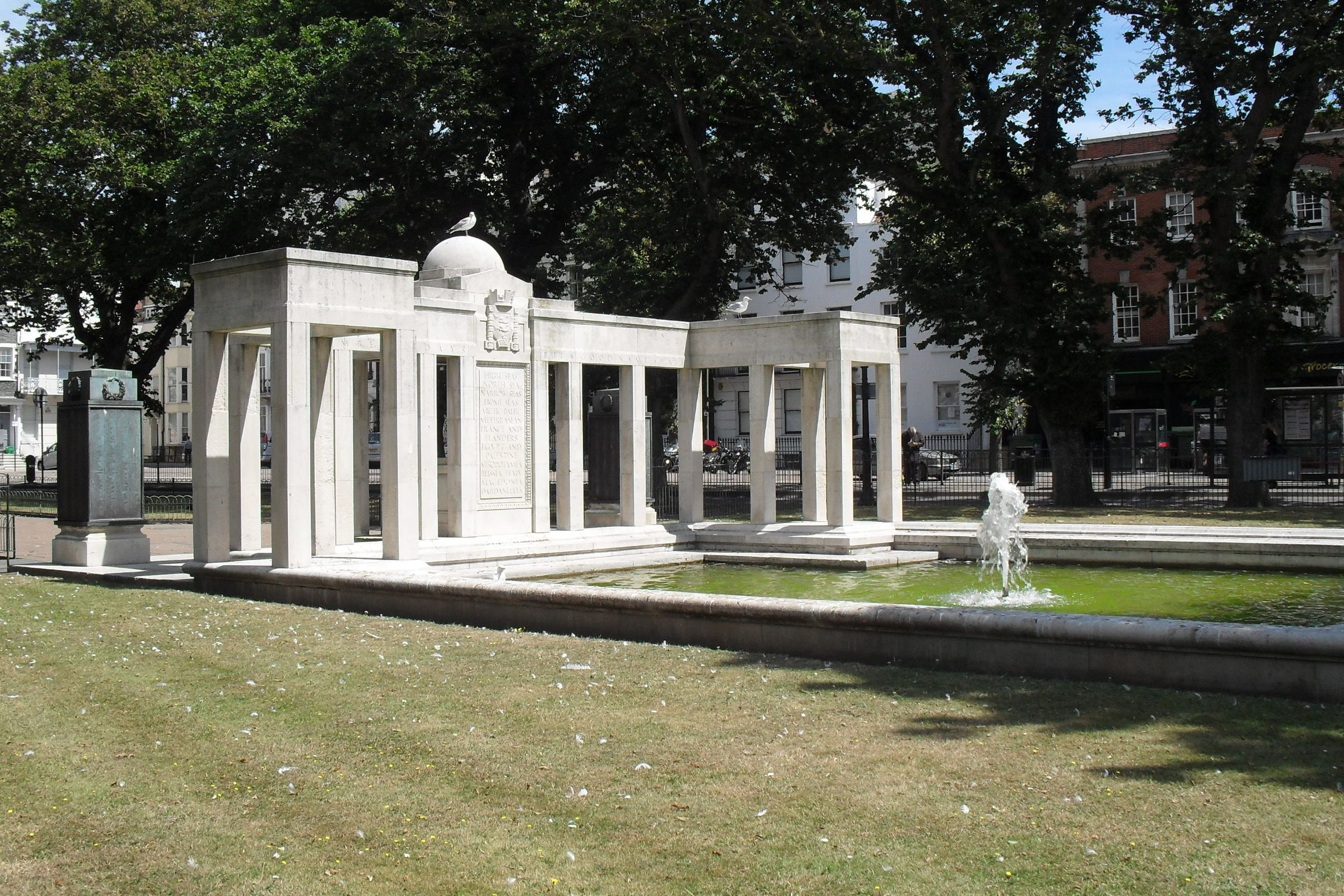
The Brighton War Memorial

Lieutenant Pruett Mullens Dennett was killed in action on 2 June 1918 near Estaires, Nord, France. His Sopwith Camel was shot down by Kurt Schönfelder, flying ace of Jasta 7 and credited with 13 aerial victories. (The German pilot was shot down weeks later, on 26 June 1918, when his Fokker D.VII was defeated by Sopwith Camels flown by 210 Squadron.) Dennett is commemorated on the Arras Flying Services Memorial at the Faubourg d'Amiens Cemetery on the Boulevard du General de Gaulle in Arras, Pas-de-Calais, France. In addition, Dennett is represented on the Brighton War Memorial at the Old Steine Gardens in Brighton, East Sussex, England.

He was 19 years old.
