= John Cordy Burrows =

Sir John Cordy Burrows (1813–1876) was a British surgeon and local politician.

== Life ==
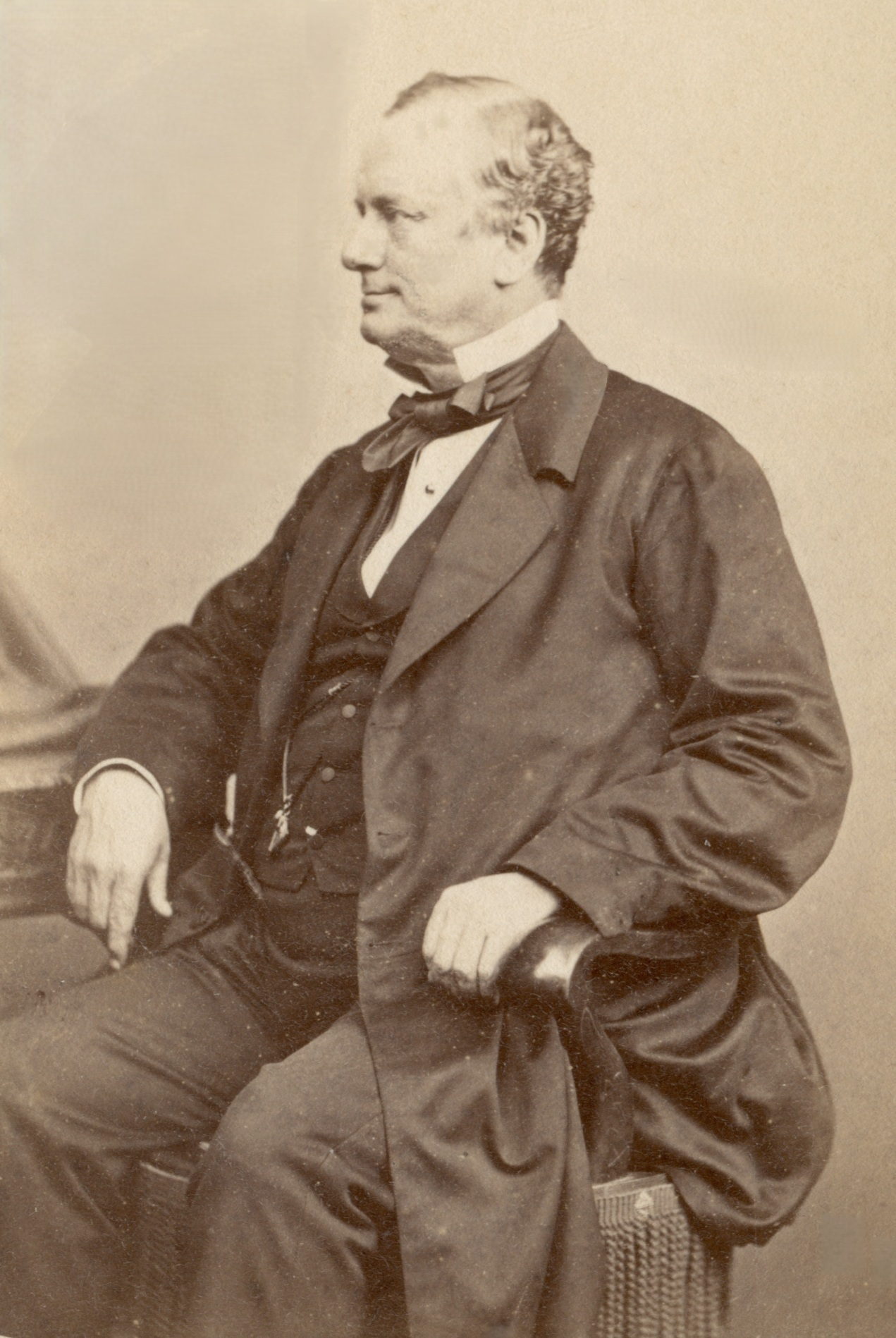
Sir J. Cordy Burrows, c.1873

Burrows was born at Ipswich on 5 August 1813. He was the second child of Robert Burrows, silversmith, of Ipswich, by his wife, Elizabeth, daughter of James Cordy of London. His elder brother was the artist and photographer Robert Burrows. He was educated at the Ipswich School, but, left at an early age to become an apprentice to the surgeon Mr. William Jeffreson in Framlingham, with whom he diligently applied himself to his profession. Moving to Brighton in 1837, he became an assistant to the surgeon Mr. Dix to whom he was distantly related. After two years he started a practice of his own.

His medical studies had been conducted at Guy's and St. Thomas's hospitals. He qualified at the Society of Apothecaries in 1835, became a member of the Royal College of Surgeons in 1836, and was admitted a fellow in 1852. Once in practice for himself it was not long before he came into public notice, and, while not neglecting his professional work, found both time and energy to do many other things. In 1841 along with Dr. Turrell he projected the Royal Literary and Scientific Institution. He also took part in the establishment at Brighton of the Brighton Mechanics' Institution. He was secretary from 1841 to 1857, and afterwards treasurer. He projected the fountain on the Steine in 1846, raised the money for its erection, and then laid out and planted the enclosures near it entirely at his own expense. His attention was next directed to the sanitary condition of the town, and under his advice the Health of Towns Act was adopted. He came still more prominently forward in 1849 as one of the town committee who purchased the Royal Pavilion from the Commissioners of Woods and Forests for the sum of £53,000. On the charter for Brighton being obtained in 1854 he was returned at the head of the poll for the Pavilion ward. In 1857 he was elected mayor, and he continued in that office during the following year.

The high esteem in which he was held by the inhabitants of Brighton was evinced on 13 October 1871 by the presentation of a costly testimonial consisting of a handsome carriage and a pair of horses, and other gifts. In consequence of a petition to the crown, asking that his great services to Brighton might receive public recognition, he was knighted by the queen at Osborne on 5 February 1873.

He was a fellow of the Linnean, Zoological, Geographical, and other learned societies, brigade surgeon of the Brighton artillery corps, and chairman of the lifeboat committee. He was one of the two promoters of the Extramural Cemetery, and at great expense to himself obtained the order for discontinuing sepultures in the churches, chapels, and graveyards of the town. His aversions were street organ-players and itinerant hawkers, none of whom were allowed to exercise their callings in the borough in the period during which his will was law.

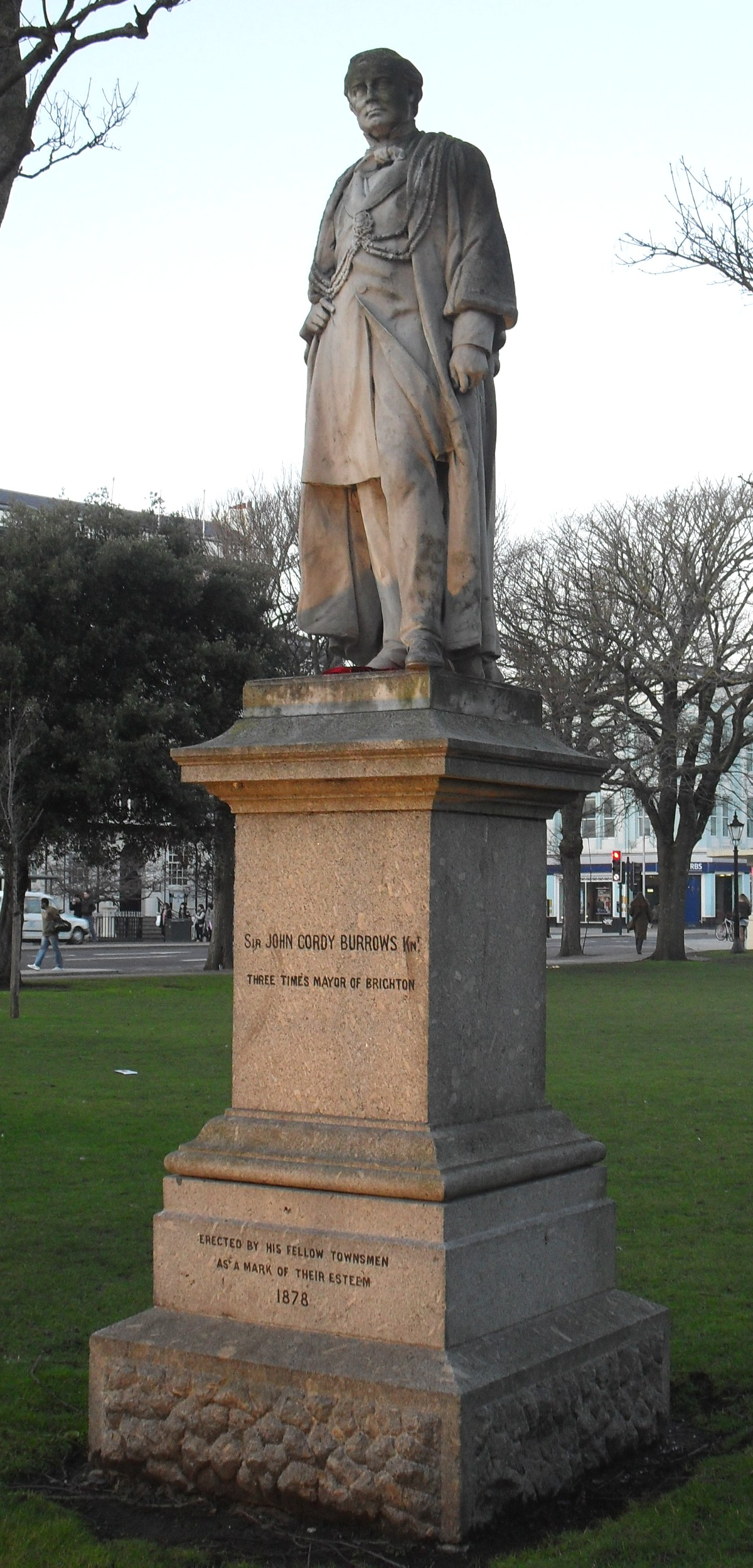
Statue of John Cordy Burrows at Old Steine Gardens, Brighton

He died at 62 Old Steine, Brighton, on 25 March 1876. His interment took place at the Extramural Cemetery on 1 April. His statue, erected in the grounds of the Royal Pavilion, was unveiled on 14 February 1878; it was moved to the south end of Old Steine in 1984, and was listed at Grade II in 1999.

He married, 19 October 1842, Jane, daughter of Arthur Dendy of Dorking; she died in 1877, leaving one son, William Seymour Burrows, who succeeded to his father's practice.
