= Bruno De Roeper =

British World War I flying ace

Bruno Philip Henry de Roeper
- Born: 22 March 1892; Forest Gate, London
- Died: 1965; Nottingham, England
- Military career
- Allegiance: United Kingdom
- Branch: Royal Naval Air Service; Royal Air Force
- Service years: 1915–1925; 1939–1946
- Rank: Group Captain
- Unit: No. 6 Squadron RNAS
- Conflicts: World War I World War II
- Awards: Air Force Cross

Group Captain Bruno Philip Henry de Roeper, AFC (1892–1965) was a British World War I flying ace credited with five aerial victories, who went on to serve during World War II.

== Biography ==
=== World War I service ===
De Roeper joined the Royal Naval Air Service on 16 April 1915 as a Temporary Flight Sub-Lieutenant, based at HMS President. On 1 July he was granted the Royal Aero Club Aviators Certificate No. 1379 after flying a Grahame-White biplane at the Grahame-White Flying School at Hendon Aerodrome, and was confirmed in his rank on 26 October.

De Roeper was first assigned to an RNAS Coastal Air Station based at Redcar, Yorkshire, flying coastal defence and anti-Zeppelin patrols. He was involved in two separate crashes in 1916, both at Redcar; firstly a forced landing in a Caudron G.3 on 20 February, and then in a B.E.2c just after midnight on 3 May, while returning from a patrol, when he struck a searchlight on landing.

From there, he was posted to No. 6 Squadron RNAS, where he flew a Nieuport Scout. On 3 December 1916 he was appointed Acting Flight Commander. On 20 May 1917, he scored his first victory, driving down an Albatros two-seater out of control north-west of Bohain. Five days later, on 25 May, he swooped down on a German two-seater, only to be wounded in the jaw by the observer. The wound kept de Roeper out of action until July. As he recuperated, on 4 April he was promoted Flight Lieutenant and the squadron converted to Sopwith Camels. Between 22 July and 20 August 1917, he drove down four more enemy aircraft out of control. He was then assigned to instructor duty, which he carried out for the rest of the war. In the New Year's Honours list, he was promoted to Squadron Commander, effective from 1 January 1918. De Roeper was awarded the Air Force Cross while based in Egypt in May 1919.

=== Inter-war career ===
On 1 August 1919, de Roeper received a full Royal Air Force commission in the rank of Major (later converted to Squadron Leader), and the following day at Romford married Jean Julia Key, of Upminster, Essex.

He then served at the Central Flying School at RAF Upavon, before being transferred to the School of Photography at RAF Farnborough on 15 August 1921, and finally to No. 1 Flying Training School at RAF Netheravon on 20 March 1922.

On 14 November 1924, de Roeper was proposed by William James Stewart Lockyer to be a Fellow of the Royal Astronomical Society.

On 16 December 1924, he was appointed to the Aeronautical Committee of Guarantee in Germany. This was the successor to the Military Commission of Control, tasked with the post-war oversight of Germany's industrial production. On 11 March 1925 he was posted to No. 1 RAF Depot at RAF Uxbridge, and on 16 April, de Roeper left regular Royal Air Force service, being placed on the retired list.

De Roeper maintained his interests in aviation, requalifying as a pilot in 1931, being granted Aviators Certificate No. 10158 at Brooklands Flying School in November, and working in the aircraft industry. By April 1939 he was a business manager for Rootes when the Air Minister Sir Kingsley Wood visited Rootes' shadow factory at Speke Aerodrome that was then building the Bristol Blenheim.

=== World War II ===
De Roeper rejoined the Royal Air Force in the rank of Squadron Leader during World War II, being transferred from the General Duties to the Technical Branch on 24 April 1940. He was promoted to Wing Commander on 1 January 1944, and later to Temporary Group Captain, this being made war substantive on 24 March 1945. On 3 March 1946, de Roeper returned to the retired list at his own request, retaining the rank of Group Captain.
