= Redcar Aerodrome =

First World War military aerodrome in North Yorkshire, England

Redcar Aerodrome
- RNAS Redcar, RAF Redcar
- Redcar, North Yorkshire in England
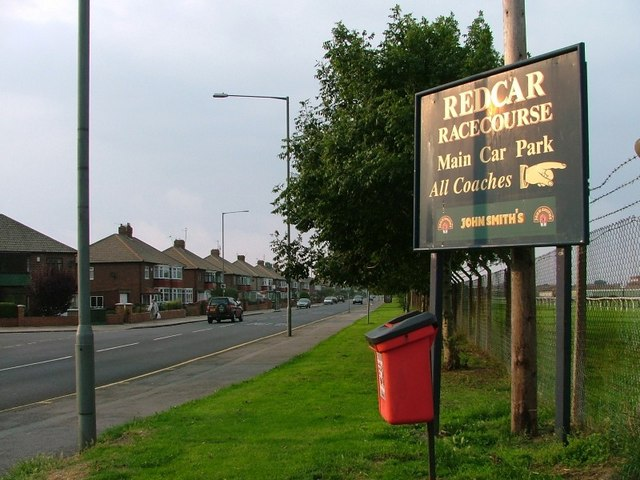
- West Dyke Road, Redcar; site of the base

Site information
- Type: Aerodrome
- Owner: Air Ministry
- Operator: RNAS; RAF

Location
- Coordinates: 54.602°N 1.069°W
- Grid reference: NZ601234
- Area: 140 acres (57 ha)

Site history
- Built: 1915
- In use: July 1915 – December 1919
- Fate: Used for housing

Redcar Aerodrome is a former First World War airfield located in Redcar, North Yorkshire, England. The site hosted an elementary flying school for newly entered pilots into the Royal Naval Air Service, though some offensive and defensive operations were flown from Redcar as well. The base was created as part of chain of new air stations after the German naval bombardment of east coast towns in December 1914. The base had a brief operational lifespan between July 1915 and December 1919, after which it was decided not to retain Redcar as an active station, and much of the site has been re-used for housing.

== History ==
The aerodrome was opened in the early part of the First World War, though its first unit did not form until July 1915. Redcar was developed along with many other sites in response to the raid on Scarborough, Hartlepool and Whitby, a German naval bombardment in which over 100 civilians were killed. This task fell to the Royal Naval Air Service as opposed to the Royal Flying Corps, who on the outbreak of the war, were largely sent to the Front. Rather than using the existing grassed area of Redcar Racecourse, the site was immediately to the west and was initially used for flying training only. Redcar was one of four (RNAS) sites used to train pilots on their elementary flying training (the others being Chingford, Eastchurch and Vendome, although Eastbourne and Manston were also used). Records show that Redcar was also used to train existing pilots in instructor duties, so most of those transiting through, would already be familiar to flying. Other Flying Instructors School(s) (FIS), were located at Ayr, Curragh, Gosport, Lilbourne and Shoreham.

Redcar covered over 140 acres (57 ha) and grew to have four aircraft sheds, three measuring 180 feet (55 m) by 60 feet (18 m), and the fourth, 200 feet (61 m) by 100 feet (30 m). However, the station wasn't equipped with an officers' mess, and trainee pilots were hosted in the local village, requiring them to walk to and from the aerodrome four times a day.

On the night of 8/9 August 1916, the aerodrome was attacked by a Zeppelin. No lasting damage or injuries occurred, but the electricity supply to the camp was severed. It was recognised that the aircraft of the RNAS were quite ineffective at night combat against Zeppelins, and an admiralty report stated that aircraft were not reliable enough to be launched from land, and advocated using seaplanes and the closure of aerodromes at Scarborough, Whitley Bay, Hornsea and Redcar in favour of seaplane stations.

Although designated as a training airfield, and used mostly as that, some defensive and offensive operations were launched from Redcar, most notable from 1917 when it became a Temporary Marine Operations (Aeroplane) station. In September 1917, four Handley Page 0/100 aircraft were detached from 7 (Naval) Squadron (later No. 207 Squadron), to engage in Anti-Submarine Warfare (ASW). This task was also undertaken in 1918 by detachments of Bristol Scouts from No. 273 Squadron, which was based at Burgh Castle at the time.

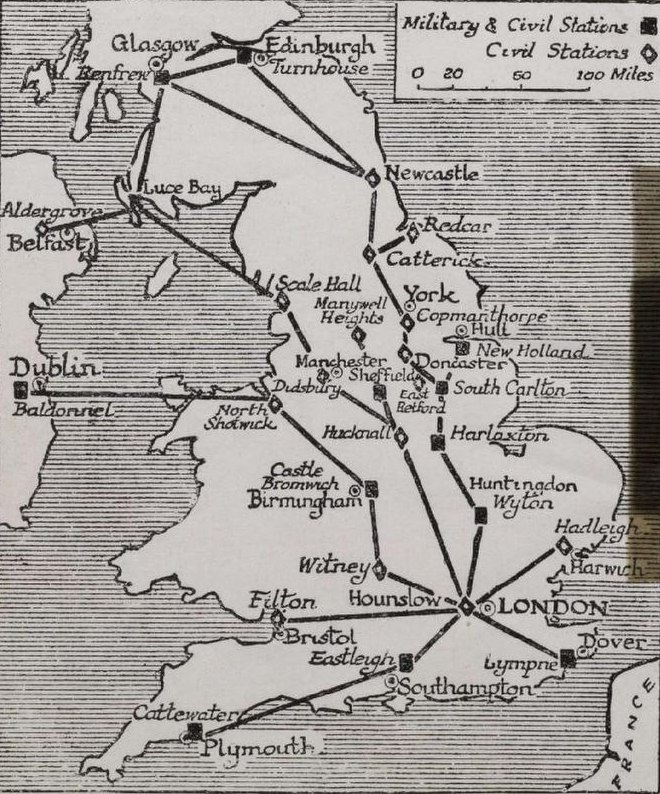
"Map of Air Routes and Landing Places in Great Britain, published in 1919, showing Redcar as a "civil station"

In April 1918, the North Eastern Flying Instructors School formed at the base, and in October of the same year, No. 63 Training Squadron arrived from RAF Joyce Green.

In December 1919, an order was released stating that Redcar was not to be used as it was in the process of closing down. The western edge of the base, which hosted the technical site, has been re-used for housing. The base was left alone after 1919 and not broken up until 1923, when explosives were used to dislodge the hardcore. This was then re-used in a local road to Eston.

== Crashes ==
It was estimated that at least 8,000 aircrew died in training accidents during the First World War. Just like many other First World War aerodromes, the attrition rate for pilots at Redcar was high, especially among the training cadre. Over 130 crashes involving aircraft which had RNAS/RAF Redcar as a home base between July 1915 and April 1918 have been recorded. Probationary officer Francis Titcomb crashed his aircraft near Egton on his first solo flight in April 1917. Whilst he survived the crash, he succumbed to his wounds in a nearby farmhouse. A grade II listed cross marks the site of the crash.

On 2 April 1918, Charles Edward Pattison crashed his Sopwith Camel aircraft at Redcar after hitting overhead wires. Pattison died from his injuries becoming one of the first casualties of the newly-formed Royal Air Force.

== Based units ==
Between 1915 and 1919, the following units were based at Redcar:

Units at RNAS/RAF Redcar
Unit	Dates	Details	Ref
7 Squadron RNAS	September 1917 – October 1917	Detached from Coedekerque, left for Manston	
C Flight (No. 510 Special Duty Flight)	June 1918 – November 1918	This detachment used Dh6 aircraft on convoy escort duties. Later became part of No. 251 Squadron RAF and No. 252 Squadron RAF; No 510 Flight was moved to West Ayton.	
Northeastern Area Flying Instructors School	July 1918 – May 1919	Absorbed by Northwestern Area Flying Instructors School	
Northwestern Area Flying Instructors' School	January 1918 – June 1919	Posted in from RAF Ayr, disbanded in June 1919	
School of Special Flying	April 1918 – July 1918	Disbanded to become Northeastern Area Flying Instructors School	
No. 63 Training Squadron	October 1918 – September 1919	Moved to Redcar from Joyce Green, No. 63 TS disbanded at Redcar in September 1919	

== Notable personnel ==
Some pilots have erroneously been recorded as having postings to Redcar, when in fact they were sent to Marske Aerodrome, some 1.2 miles (2 km) to the east. Due to the proximity of both aerodromes, and as the postal town for Marske was Redcar, some errors have crept in.

- Raymond Collishaw, trained at the base between February and July 1916
- Richard Bell Davies, made commanding officer of Redcar in January 1916 (along with Killingholme, Whitley Bay and Scarborough air stations)
- Bruno De Roeper, flew defensive patrols from the base
- Pruett Mullens Dennett
- Thomas Gerrard
- Walter G. R. Hinchliffe
- Oliver LeBoutillier, student at Redcar in 1917
- Edwin Swale, trained at Redcar
- Ronald Sykes, trained at Redcar
