= Brighton War Memorial =

Memorial in Brighton, England

- United Kingdom
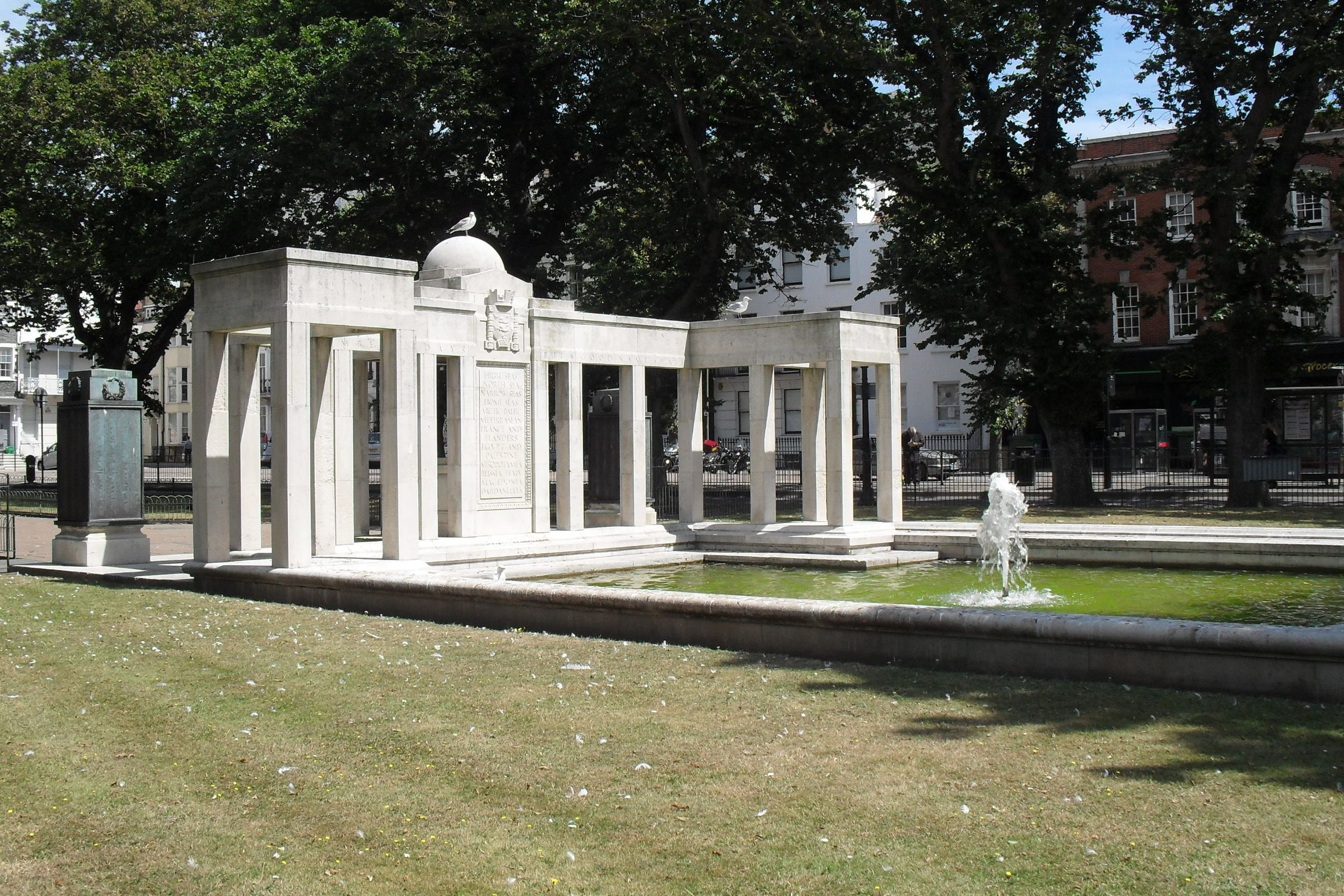
- The memorial in 2010
- For casualties from Brighton killed in the First World War
- Unveiled: 7 October 1922
- Location: 50°49′17″N 0°08′13″W; Old Steine, Brighton, England
- Designed by: John William Simpson

Listed Building – Grade II
- Official name: Brighton War Memorial
- Designated: 26 August 1999
- Reference no.: 1380675

Brighton War Memorial is a First World War memorial in Brighton, on the south coast of England. Designed by John William Simpson, it stands in Old Steine Gardens, close to the Royal Pavilion and multiple other monuments. Recruitment to the armed forces was strong in Brighton, and many of the town's public buildings, including the pavilion, were converted into hospitals. The first casualties to arrive were from the local Royal Sussex Regiment, but Brighton came to be associated with Indian soldiers. Around 12,000 Indians were treated in the Pavilion and other makeshift hospitals in Brighton and 74 died.

A subcommittee of the borough council directly approached Simpson, a national architect with local roots, to design a memorial. Simpson's proposal was displayed in the local art gallery while funds were raised by public subscription. The design is based on a Roman water garden and consists of a colonnade (row of columns) at the head of a reflecting pool, flanked by two pylons (pillars) which contain the names of the dead. In the middle of the pool is a fountain and in the centre of the colonnade is a classical temple-shaped screen which contains the main dedications. The rear face of the screen contains an altar table.

The memorial was unveiled on 7 October 1922 by Admiral of the Fleet Earl Beatty. Other memorials were built to commemorate the pavilion's role as a hospital and the Indian soldiers who died in the town. The site is close to the Egyptian Campaign Memorial (1888) and a modern memorial to casualties from later conflicts. The First World War monument is a Grade II listed building.

== Background ==
Brighton was a popular seaside destination and remained so at the beginning of the First World War in 1914 but, within weeks, major buildings in the town were converted into makeshift military hospitals—among them the local workhouse, the grammar school, and the Royal Pavilion (a former royal palace that had been undergoing restoration). The first wave of casualties was 300 men from the local regiment, the Royal Sussex. Brighton came to be particularly associated with Indian soldiers—around 12,000 were treated in the town after being wounded on the Western Front. Among the most famous was a Victoria Cross recipient who received his award at the hospital, Mir Dast. The Indian soldiers had all left Brighton by 1916, but the hospitals continued treating other casualties until after the end of the war.

The Indian soldiers attracted considerable attention, including from tourists who travelled to see them, to the point that the authorities erected screens to give the men privacy. King George V and Queen Mary paid a morale-boosting visit to the Pavilion in August 1915. Seventy-four Indian soldiers died of their wounds in Brighton. The Muslims were buried in a plot near Shah Jahan Mosque in Surrey, to the north of Brighton. The Hindu and Sikh soldiers were cremated at a site in the South Downs hills on the northern edge of Brighton.

Recruitment to the armed forces was strong in Brighton, especially early on. At the outbreak of war, many reservists were called up and many retired servicemen rejoined. Recruiting rallies were held in the Dome (an entertainment venue formerly part of the pavilion complex), recruiters visited local employers, and a recruiting station was set up in the town hall, where initially men aged 19–30 could sign up. Around 550 men volunteered in the first three weeks of the war. Recruitment slowed down as the war progressed, and in November 1915 a captured German field gun was presented to the town in an attempt to boost enlistment; by that point it was estimated that 20,000 men from Brighton and the surrounding areas had joined the armed forces.

== Inception ==
Following the war, thousands of memorials were built in towns and cities across Britain. Following the armistice in November 1918, Brighton Borough Council almost immediately began making plans to commemorate the casualties. It formed a Peace Celebration and War Memorial Subcommittee, which invited public suggestions. In 1920, the subcommittee called a public meeting to discuss plans for a permanent war memorial. As in many places, suggestions were put forward for a practical scheme, including an orphanage, but these were ruled out because, in the subcommittee's view, they "did not meet the most essential requirements of a war memorial, i.e. embodying in a permanent form the sacrifices of those who have fallen or suffered on account of the war".

The subcommittee approached the architect John William Simpson. Simpson was an established national architect who specialised in public buildings. He was born in Brighton and his father, Thomas Simpson, was a well-known local architect. The younger Simpson was responsible for multiple schools in the area and later in his career worked on several memorials, including an earlier war memorial, The Bugler (1904), on Brighton seafront. The subcommittee allocated Simpson a budget of £5,000, which it later reduced to £3,000 (approximately £116,000 at 2025 prices). Another local architect, John Leopold Denman, submitted a design to the subcommittee but this was rejected on cost grounds. Simpson's plans were displayed in Brighton Art Gallery in 1921 to favourable public response, especially in light of the architect's local connections.

The subcommittee opened subscriptions in 1921 for a fund to pay for the memorial. It started with direct appeals to prominent local residents and businesses. The chosen site was Old Steine Gardens, on the Old Steine—the meeting point of the main roads into Brighton. The site is just east of the Royal Pavilion and close to several other war memorials and other monuments. The chosen site was occupied by a statue of George IV (erected in 1828), which was moved to a position close to the North Gate of the Royal Pavilion, just to the west, to make way. At the end of 1921, a collecting box and an outline model of the design were placed on the site.

== Design ==
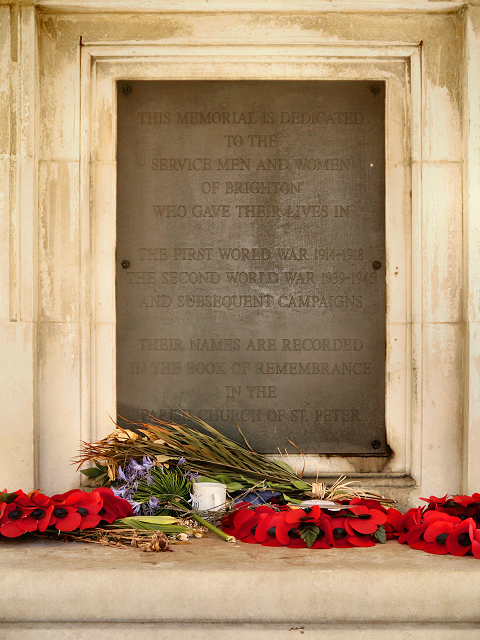
The dedication on the north face of the memorial, and wreaths laid on top of the altar table

The memorial consists of a colonnade (row of columns) and a reflecting pool with a fountain. It is built from Portland stone in an Italianate style, based on a Roman water garden.

The pool is roughly square in plan with chamfered corners. The fountain stands in the middle of the pool. The colonnade, at the north end of the pool, is 3.2 metres (10 feet) deep and 11 metres (36 feet) long. It has four sides and is stepped back to form a U shape. The centrepiece is a rectangular stone panel set between the columns, resembling a shrine or temple and surmounted by a dome, which brings it to a height of 4 metres (13 feet). The temple has an altar table built in on the north side, above which is a metal plaque carrying the main inscription. The water represents the Royal Navy and the Merchant Navy while the memorial gardens represent the British Army and the Royal Air Force.

The colonnade is flanked by two free-standing Portland stone pylons (pillars) covered in bronze tablets which bear the names of 2,597 dead, including three women. The memorial subcommittee was responsible for compiling the names, most of which were nominated by relatives. Some were missed if they had no remaining family in Brighton to nominate them, while some nominations were rejected if the subcommittee deemed that the casualty's ties to Brighton were not strong enough (for example, they were born in the town but moved away, they worked in Brighton but lived outside the borough boundary, or the family moved to Brighton after the war). Owing to space constraints, the subcommittee opted to list the casualties only by surname and first initial. Further details were recorded in a book of remembrance, which was placed in St Peter's Church.

The main dedication is on the back of the temple, facing north: "We cheered you forth noble and kind and brave / under your country's triumphing flag you fell / it floats true hearts over quiet grave / brave and noble and kind hail and farewell". Around the tops of the pylons, above the names, is the inscription: "A good life hath / its number of days / but a good name shall / continue for ever" (from Ecclesiasticus 41:13). A bronze plaque, added to the temple at a later date, reads: "This memorial is dedicated to the service men and women of Brighton who gave their lives in the First World War 1914–1918, the Second World War (1939–1945), and subsequent campaigns. Their names are recorded in the book of remembrance in the parish church of St Peter". The names of several theatres of the First World War are carved into the front of the temple, facing the pool, and above these is carved Brighton's coat of arms. The theatres listed are "High Seas, North Seas, Home Seas, Arctic, Baltic, Mediterranean, France and Flanders, Palestine, Russia, Italy, Macedonia, Dardanelles". The architectural elements are surrounded by a rose garden, designed by the borough council's parks and gardens department at the same time as the memorial itself.

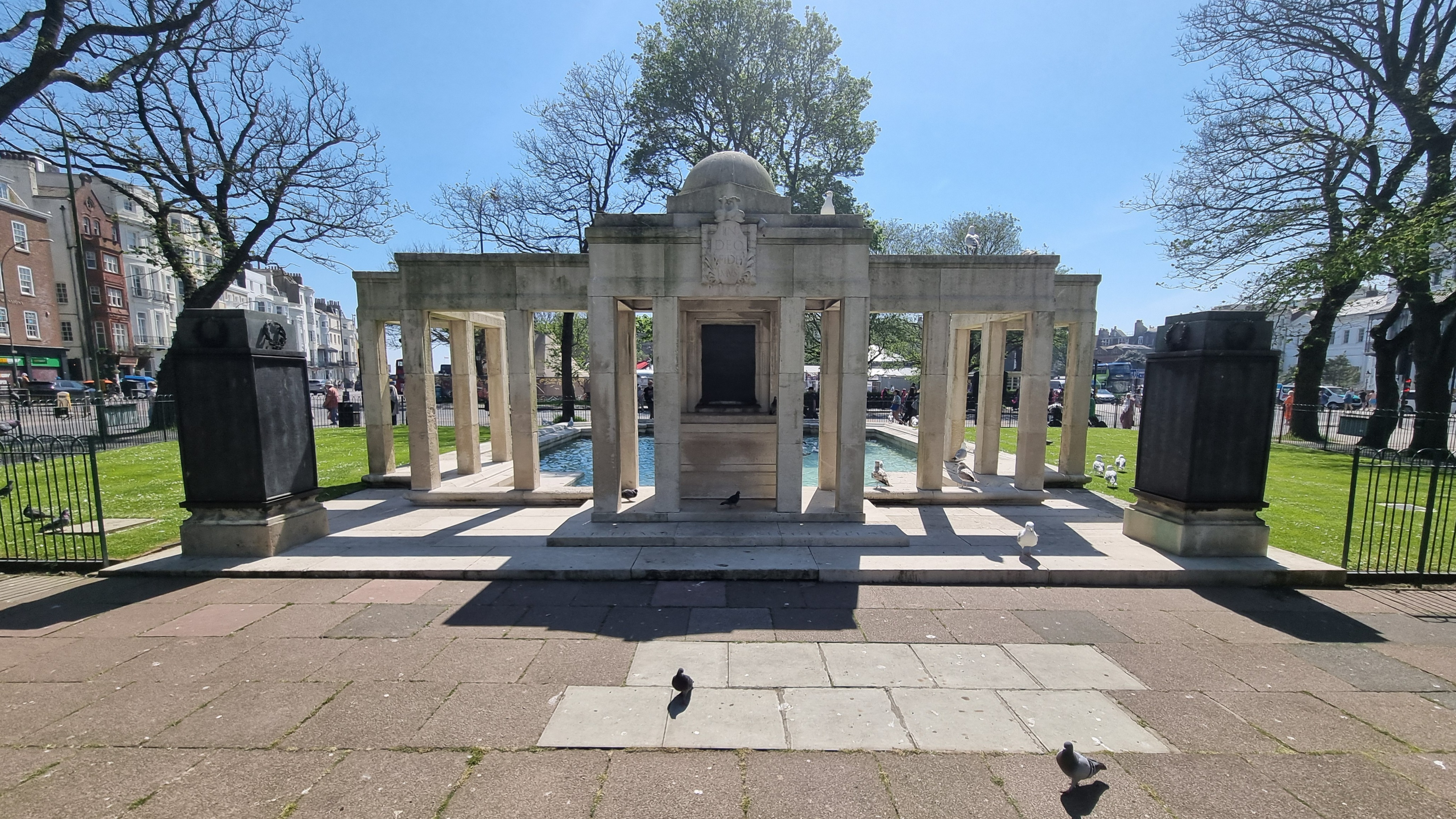
View from the north showing the rear of the colonnade, the shrine with the dome, and the pylons. The reflecting pool is visible through the columns.

== History ==
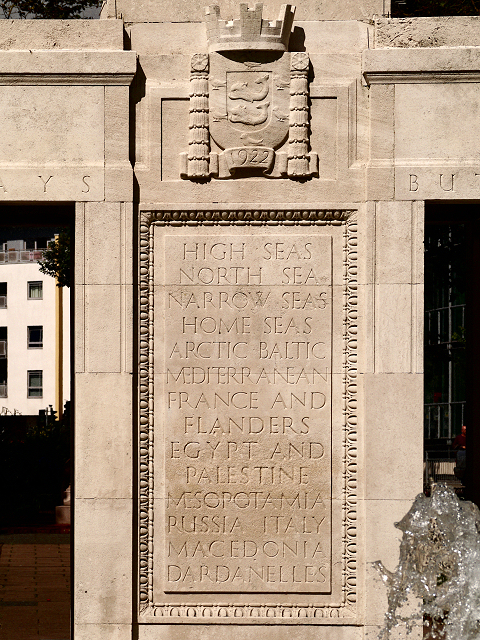
South face of the central panel, listing theatres of the First World War below the borough coat of arms

The memorial was unveiled at a ceremony on 7 October 1922 by Admiral of the Fleet Earl Beatty, a senior naval commander during the war and by then the head of the Royal Navy. The ceremony was presided over by the mayor and attended by the full borough council in their robes of office. The day's events began with Beatty receiving the Freedom of the Borough of Brighton in the council chamber at the town hall at 12:30 pm, then a lunch in the Dome for paying participants and invited guests. Finally the assembly proceeded to the war memorial. Enclosures were set aside for families of the deceased, ex-servicemen, and subscribers. The unveiling took place at 3 pm. The memorial was dedicated by the Vicar of Brighton, the Reverend Francis Dormer Pierce.

Just north of the memorial, still in Old Steine Gardens, is the Egyptian Campaign Memorial (erected 1888), an obelisk which commemorates the Royal Sussex Regiment's casualties from two conflicts in North Africa in the 1880s. Behind that is a pink granite slab (installed in 2010) dedicated to all citizens of Brighton, Hove, and Portslade killed in conflict or peacekeeping operations since 1945. In 1916, Brighton Council purchased the land near Patcham where the Hindu and Sikh soldiers were cremated, and in 1921 the Chattri was built on the site to commemorate them.

As part of commemorations for the First World War centenary, paving stones with details of Victoria Cross holders were installed at war memorials in their birth towns. Three were placed at Brighton War Memorial—for Captain Theodore Wright (in September 2014), Second Lieutenant Ernest Frederick Beal, and Major Edward "Mick" Mannock (both in July 2018). The stones were unveiled on different dates and a ceremony was held for each.

In August 2018, the memorial was vandalised by protesters who splashed red paint on it and attempted to erase the word "Palestine" in the list of theatres. In 2020, the local council proposed to replace grassed areas around the reflecting pool with flowerbeds, a plan which was opposed by veterans' and conservation groups. From 2025, the council undertook a redevelopment programme of the Old Steine area which aimed to create a new public square and cycle path between the war memorial and the pavilion.

The memorial has been a Grade II listed building, a status which provides it legal protection, since August 1999. It is the venue for multiple commemorations, particularly the annual Remembrance Sunday service, which is presided over by the mayor and attended by veterans, local politicians, and other dignitaries as well as the public.

== See also ==
- Hove War Memorial
- Grade II listed buildings in Brighton and Hove: A–B
- List of public art in Brighton and Hove
