= Old Steine Gardens =

Park in Brighton, England

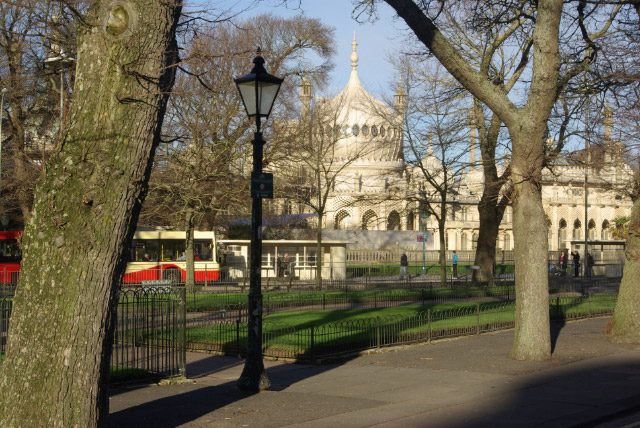
- Old Steine Gardens with Royal Pavilion in background
- Interactive map of Old Steine Gardens
- Location: Brighton, East Sussex, England
- Coordinates: 50.82078°N 0.13731°W
- Area: 1.44 acres (0.58 ha)
- Created: 1846
- Designer: Sir John Cordy Burrows

The Old Steine Gardens in Brighton, Brighton and Hove, East Sussex, England, adjacent to the Old Steine thoroughfare, are the site of several monuments of national historic significance.

== Background ==
The Old Steine was originally an open green space with a stream in the fishing village of Brighthelmstone. Local fishermen stored their boats and allowed their nets to dry there. With the passage of time, however, the fishing community was excluded. The area was drained and enclosed, and visitors to the area used the Steine to promenade. The Old Steine transformed from an area of occupation to one devoted to recreation, in the seaside resort of Brighton.

By the eighteenth century, buildings started to appear on the Old Steine. The first building to appear on the eastern side of the Steine was a circulating library built in 1760. The eastern lawns of the Royal Pavilion, originally built as a seaside retreat for George, Prince of Wales, were at one time considered part of the Old Steine.

The Old Steine thoroughfare, a one-way road system since 1926, encircles a 1.44 acre parcel of land that is triangular in shape, the Old Steine Gardens. North Street bisects Old Steine Gardens. The southern section, the southern enclosure, is roughly square in shape, and contains the Victoria Fountain and the Statue of Sir John Cordy Burrows.

Following the installation of the Victoria Fountain in 1846, the surrounding parcel of land was planted with gardens. On 21 July 1880, an oak tree was planted by mayor Henry Davey in the southwestern corner of the southern enclosure to commemorate the hundredth anniversary of the founding of Brighton's Sunday schools. One hundred years later, on 13 December 1980, another oak tree was planted by mayor John Leach in the southeastern corner of the southern enclosure to celebrate the bicentennial of the Sunday schools. However, that tree was one of the many casualties of a severe storm in October 1987.

The northern section of the Old Steine Gardens, the northern enclosure, is triangular in configuration, and contains the Brighton War Memorial and the Egyptian Campaign Memorial. As part of the 100th anniversary of World War I, the Old Steine Garden was dedicated as a Fields in Trust Centenary Field because of its local heritage and significance.

== Victoria Fountain ==
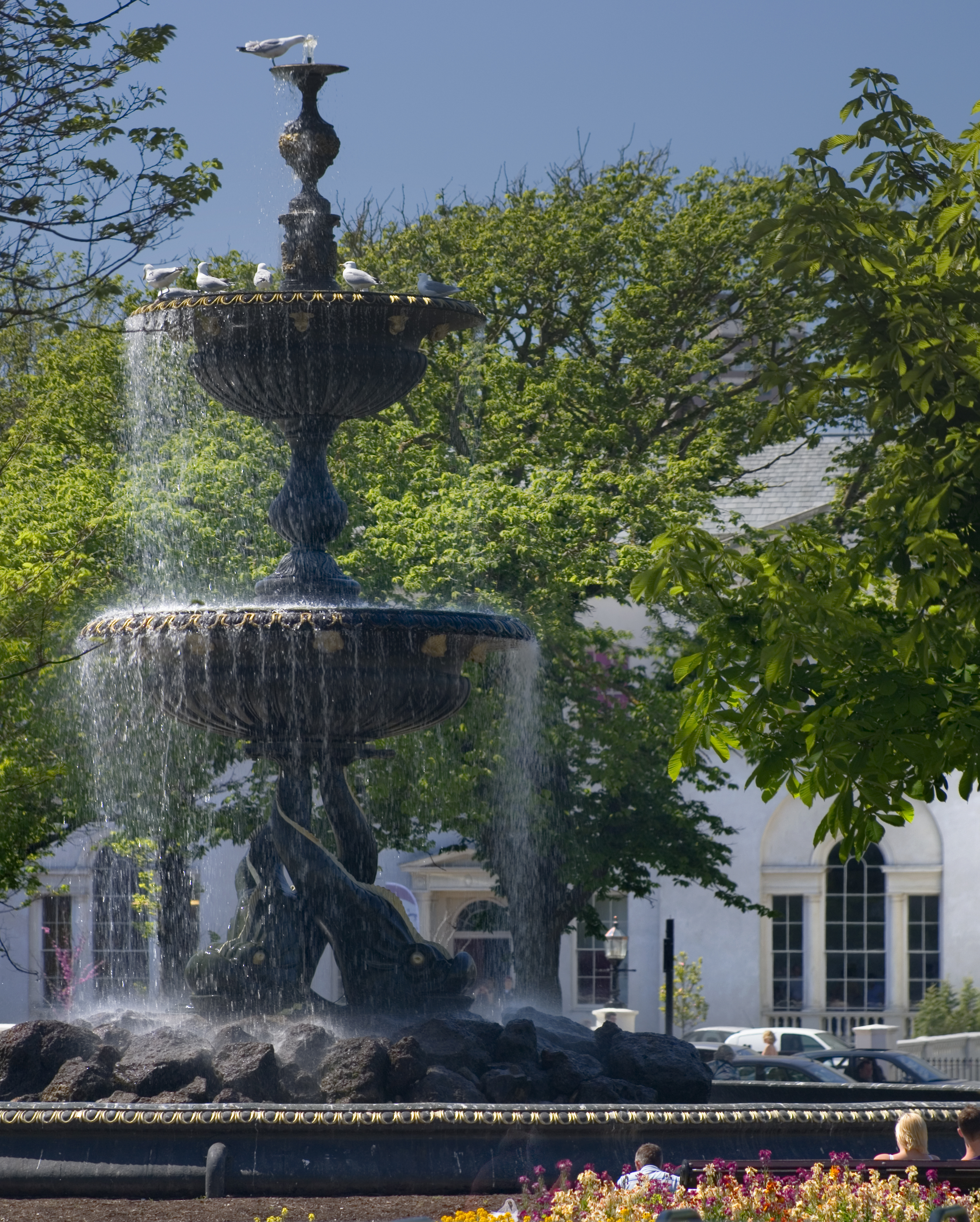
Victoria Fountain

The Victoria Fountain is located in the centre of the southern enclosure of the Old Steine Gardens. The fountain is 9.75m (32 feet) in height and includes a large, cast-iron pool with a rim decorated with egg-and-dart mouldings. Originally, the pool was filled with water lilies and goldfish. Sarsen stones in the centre of the pool were first found in the Steine by workers digging a trench in 1823. The sandstone blocks support three intertwined dolphins, upon which rests a shallow, cast-iron basin. Above this are two columns with an additional basin.

The fountain owes its existence to the efforts of John Cordy Burrows. After the commissioners of the town of Brighton decided against erecting a fountain to commemorate Queen Victoria's accession to the throne in 1837, Burrows placed a private commission with British architect Amon Henry Wilds. The project was financed by Burrows and a public subscription, as well as the proceeds of a bazaar, concert, and night at the theatre.

The dolphins were sculpted by William Pepper (1806–1887), who was from a Brighton family of wood carvers and sculptors. The castings were made by the Eagle Foundry on Gloucester Road in Brighton. The foundry was owned by partners John Yearsley and Robert Williams. Their firm also installed the fountain.

The Victoria Fountain was inaugurated on 25 May 1846 in celebration of the twenty-seventh birthday of Queen Victoria. The ceremony featured a royal salute fired from the pier head at noon, coordinated with the starting of the fountain. Music had been commissioned for the event, including "Fountain Quadrilles" by Charles Coote, the son-in-law of Burrows. Local businesses closed at 3 o'clock that afternoon. The day's festivities concluded with fireworks.

The fountain soon became a local landmark, with prints available for purchase at local bookstores. It was protected as a Grade II listed structure on 13 October 1952. A Grade II structure is felt to be nationally important and of special interest.

Restoration of the fountain commenced in 1990, and was completed before the 1995 visit of the Prince of Wales. Prince Charles unveiled a plaque commemorating the restoration of the fountain. The plaque adjacent to the south side of the fountain reads: "To Commemorate The Visit Of H.R.H. The Prince of Wales President Of The Fountain Society On 25th May 1995 To Mark The Restoration Of The Victoria Fountain With Funding By Brighton Council And Grant Aid From English Heritage."

In January 2022, it was reported that the fountain had "significant and complex structural problems and had been switched off for safety reasons". The structure is listing to one side and requires specialist work to straighten it. A 5-meter deep sinkhole appeared adjacent to the fountain in early January 2022, further calling into question the safety of the fountain and gardens surrounding it.

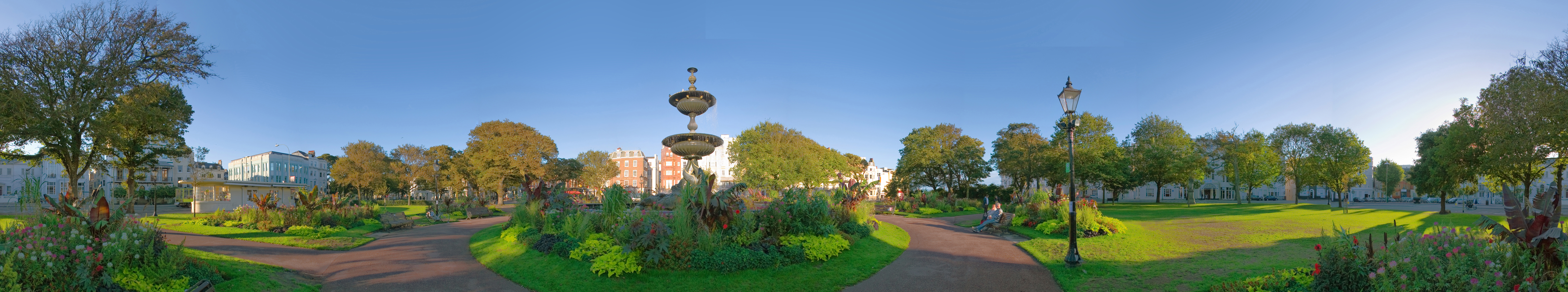
Panoramic view of Victoria Fountain and Gardens

== Statue of Sir John Cordy Burrows ==
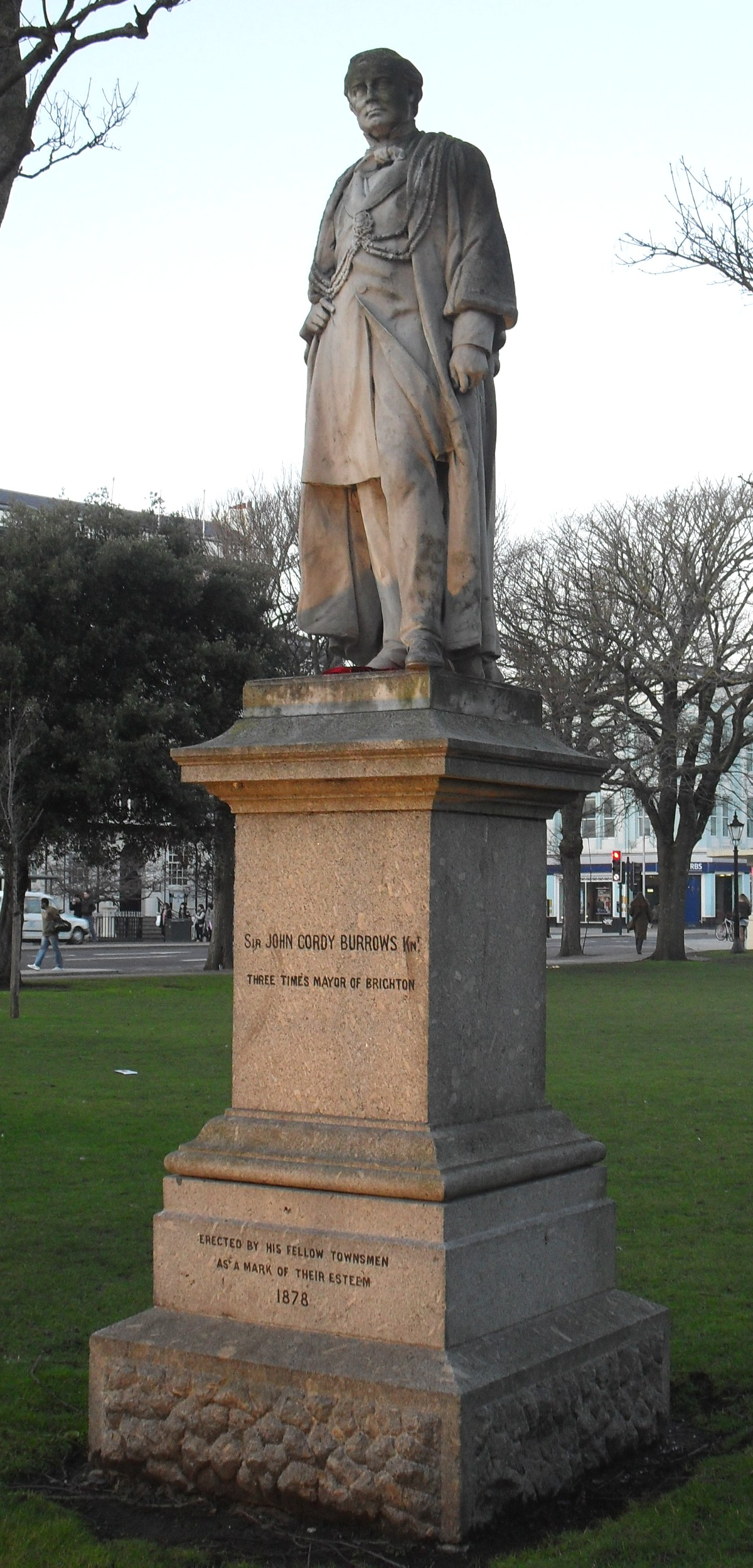
Statue of Sir John Cordy Burrows

John Cordy Burrows, eldest son of Robert Burrows and his wife Elizabeth Cordy, was born in Ipswich, Suffolk, England on 5 August 1813. He was apprenticed at an early age to a surgeon, after which he studied in London at Guy's Hospital and St. Thomas' Hospital. Burrows qualified at the Society of Apothecaries in 1835. In 1836, he became a member of the Royal College of Surgeons.

The following year, he went to Brighton, where he acted as assistant to a surgeon. Two years later, Burrows began his own practice. He found time to become active in community affairs. Burrows and another physician co-founded the Royal Literary and Scientific Institution. The surgeon was also instrumental in establishing the Brighton Mechanics' Institution, for which he was secretary from 1841 to 1857, and later, treasurer. In addition to his activities mentioned above with regard to the Victoria Fountain, he designed and planted the surrounding gardens at his own expense. The Health of Towns Act was adopted in Brighton, addressing his concerns about local sanitary conditions. In 1849, as a member of the town committee, he assisted in the purchase of the Royal Pavilion.

The surgeon was elected mayor in 1857, and again in 1858 and 1871; he was the first to be elected to that position both twice and three times. He chose the town motto "In Deo Fidemus" and was nicknamed "King Cordy". Brighton residents presented him with a carriage, pair of horses, and other gifts in 1871. Burrows was knighted by the queen in 1873. He was one of two promoters of the Extra Mural Cemetery.

Sir John Cordy Burrows died at 62 Old Steine in Brighton on 25 March 1876. Businesses closed for the funeral procession of 2,500 people, witnessed by an estimated 25,000 to 30,000 mourners. Burrows was interred at the Extra Mural Cemetery on 1 April 1876.

The Statue of Sir John Cordy Burrows was initially located at the southern end of the grounds of the Royal Pavilion, in front of Carlisle House, where it was unveiled on 14 Feb 1878. The statue is of white Sicilian marble and the plinth of grey granite. The inscription on the pedestal reads: "Sir John Cordy Burrows Knt. Three Times Mayor Of Brighton" and "Erected By His Fellow Townsmen As A Mark Of Their Esteem 1878." Burrows is depicted in his mayoral robes; at the base of the statue, the signature "E.B. Stephens 1878" appears. The monument was commissioned by the memorial committee and designed by Exeter sculptor Edward Bowring Stephens (1815–1882). The unveiling of the statue was accompanied by music that had been composed for the occasion, and sung by members of the Brighton Sacred Harmonic Society, the same group who had sung over his grave. Following the midday inauguration of the monument, there was an evening mayoral reception at the Brighton Dome. The statue was moved to its present location at the southern end of the southern enclosure of the Old Steine Gardens in 1984, when the Royal Pavilion grounds were remodelled. The Statue of Sir John Cordy Burrows was protected as a Grade II listed structure on 26 August 1999.

== Brighton War Memorial ==
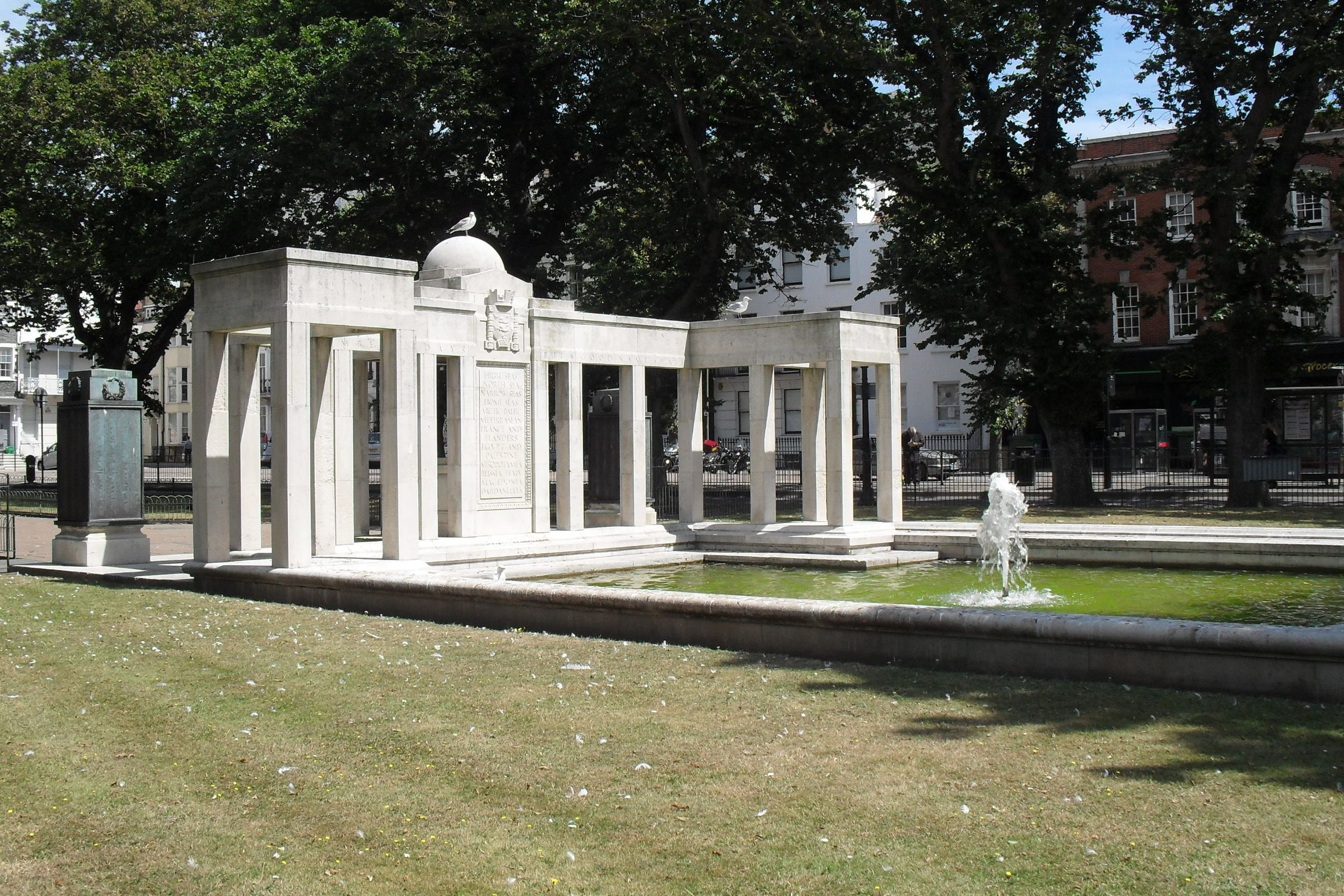
Brighton War Memorial

Brighton War Memorial is located at the south end of the northern enclosure of the Old Steine Gardens. The site was originally that of the statue of George IV but that monument was transferred to the North Gate of the Royal Pavilion. The monument was unveiled by Admiral David Beatty on 7 October 1922.

== Egyptian Campaign Memorial ==
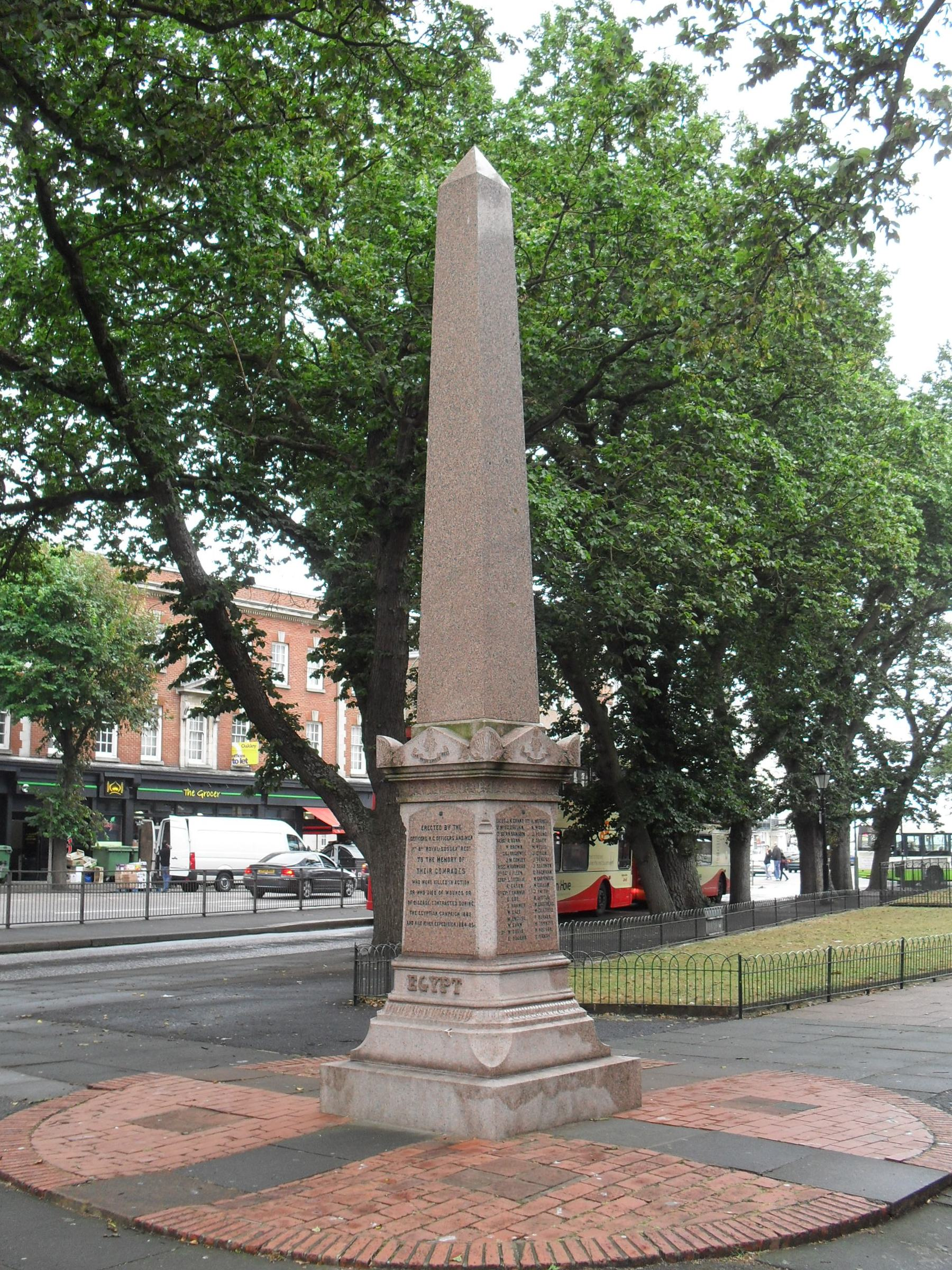
Egyptian Campaign Memorial

The Egyptian Campaign Memorial of the Royal Sussex Regiment is located at the far northern tip of the northern enclosure of the Old Steine Gardens. The granite obelisk is set on a circular brick base and has three sections. The top section is of polished granite, and the middle section has granite plaques on each side. The plaques on the south, east, and west sides of the monument list the names of the deceased. The plaque on the north side of the obelisk has an inscription which dedicates the monument. It reads: "Erected By The Officers, N.C. Officers And Men 1st Bn "Royal Sussex" Regt. To The Memory Of Their Comrades Who Were Killed In Action Or Who Died Of Wounds Or Of Disease Contracted During The Egyptian Campaign 1882 And Nile River Expedition 1884–85." On the north face of the lower section, the base of the obelisk, the word "Egypt" is in raised letters. On the south face of the base, the word "Abu-klea" is in raised letters.

The Egyptian Campaign Memorial commemorates not only those involved in the Egyptian Campaign of 1882, but also the Nile Expedition of 1884 to 1885. In early 1884, British Major General Charles George Gordon (1833–1885) was sent by the British government to Khartoum, Sudan to evacuate the British and Egyptian forces, civilian employees, and families who were being threatened by Muslim Sudanese rebels. He arrived in February 1884. However, rebel activity increased, and other British forces were eventually withdrawn from Sudan by May 1884. General Gordon organised the defence of Khartoum, and the British public began to demand a relief expedition. However, the British government did not decide to assist Gordon until August 1884. Some believe that the delay was due to the prime minister's anger at Gordon for apparently disobeying his orders, and not completing the evacuation. In late August, a request was relayed to the governor-general of Canada that a detachment of Canadian voyageurs be organised and sent to Africa to participate in the mission. It was not until almost November that the Nile Expedition, the British and Canadian relief force, was ready. The expedition was attacked by Sudanese rebels at Abu-Klea; the Battle of Abu-klea was fought on 17 January 1885. When the expedition arrived in Khartoum on 28 January 1885, the city had already fallen two days previously and General Gordon had been killed.

The monument was erected by the officers and men of the First Battalion of the Royal Sussex Regiment in 1888. The Egyptian Campaign Memorial was protected as a Grade II listed structure on 20 August 1971.
