= John Denman =

John Denman may refer to:

- John Denman (cricketer), English cricketer
- John Leopold Denman, English architect
