= The Abbey, Storrington =

Coordinates: 50°54′54.49″N 0°27′23.29″W

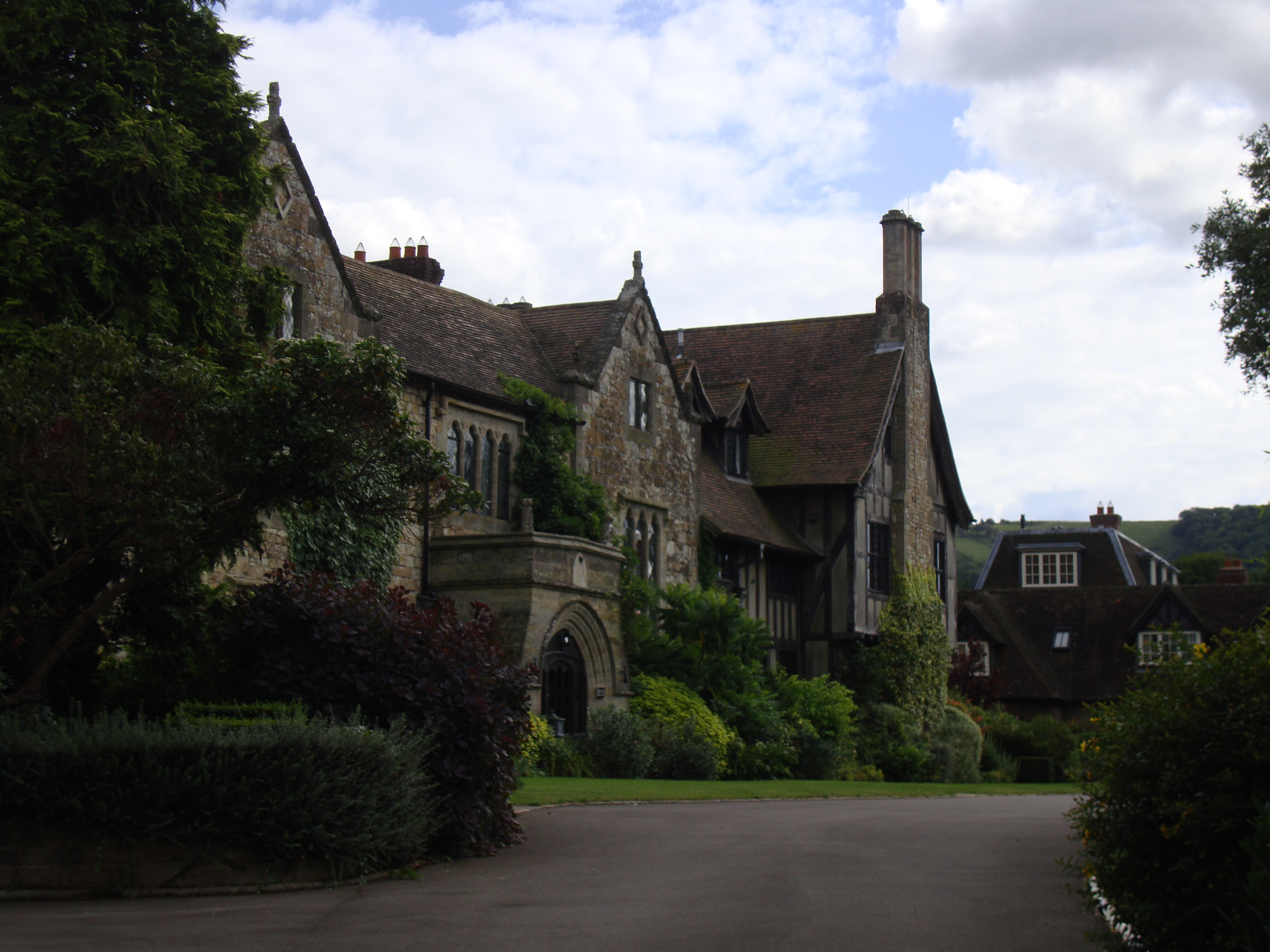
St Joseph's Abbey, Storrington

St Joseph's Abbey (The Abbey), Storrington at Storrington in Sussex, England, was originally a rectory, later a small country house and then a convent school.

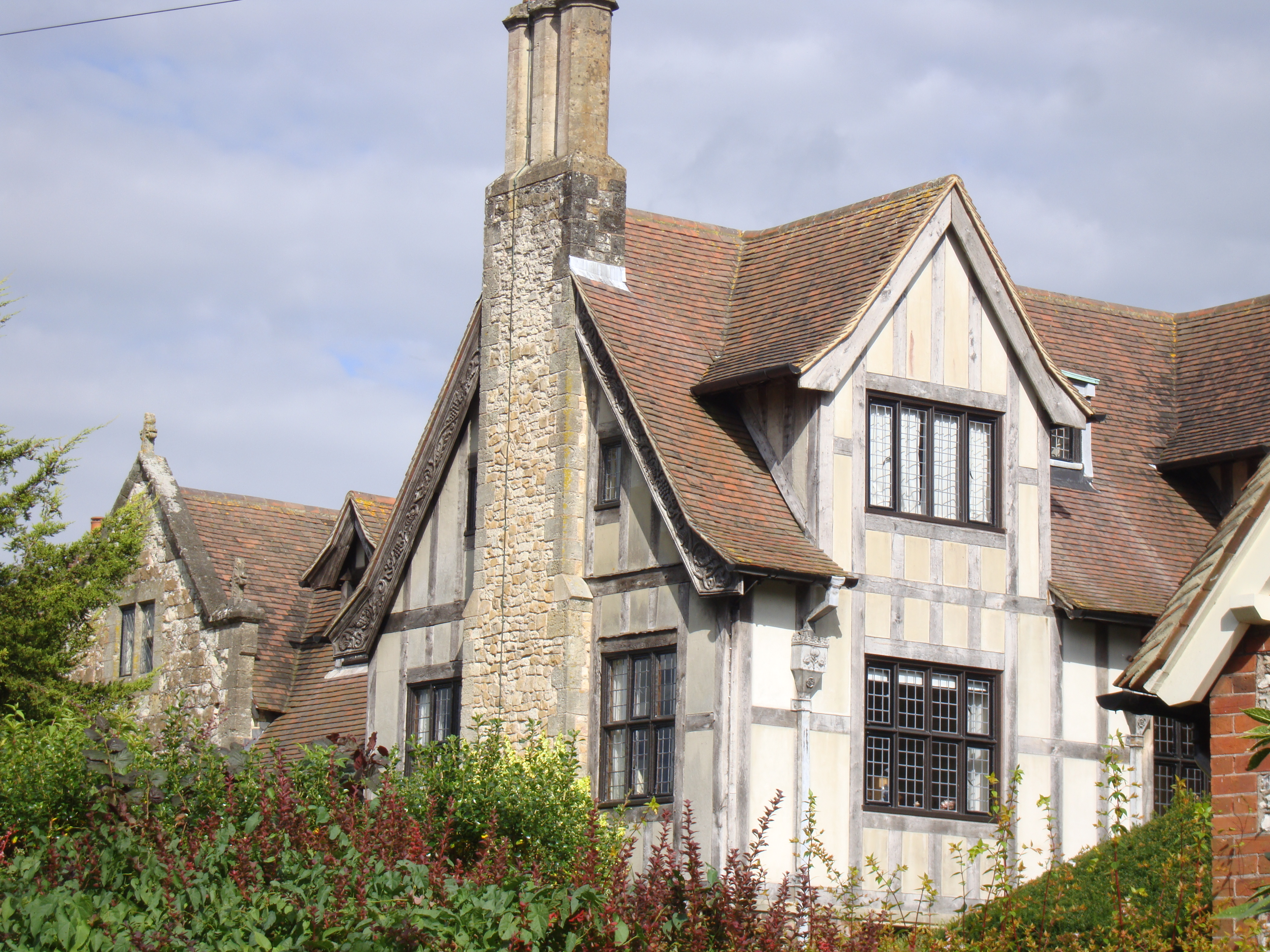
St Joseph's Abbey, Storrington

It is an irregular five bay, two and three storey house built in 1871-2 by the Rev. George Faithfull in the Victorian Gothic style, reusing material from the 1621 rectory which was demolished at this time. In the 1880s it was the residence of Colonel Walter George Stirling, a baronet who had a pedigree herd of Jersey cattle. Successive tenants altered the house; in 1911 (semi-timbered work) and 1930 (brick range) when Colonel H. V. Ravenscroft added a billiard room and ballroom designed by John Leopold Denman.

In 1953 the house became a Dominican convent and boarding school. The school closed in 1999. Inside, the oldest part of the building has the former Dining Room (now Chapel) with good quality 19th- century linenfold panelling and frieze, plastered ceiling with strapwork ribs and stained glass windows. The Drawing Room has early 18th-century panelling and a fireplace with engaged columns; and the former Library (currently Meeting Room) has a 16th-century stone fireplace. There is an elaborate oak main staircase with turned balusters and a painted well staircase with turned balusters and chamfered square newel posts with ball finials.
