= John Leopold Denman =

British architect (1882–1975)

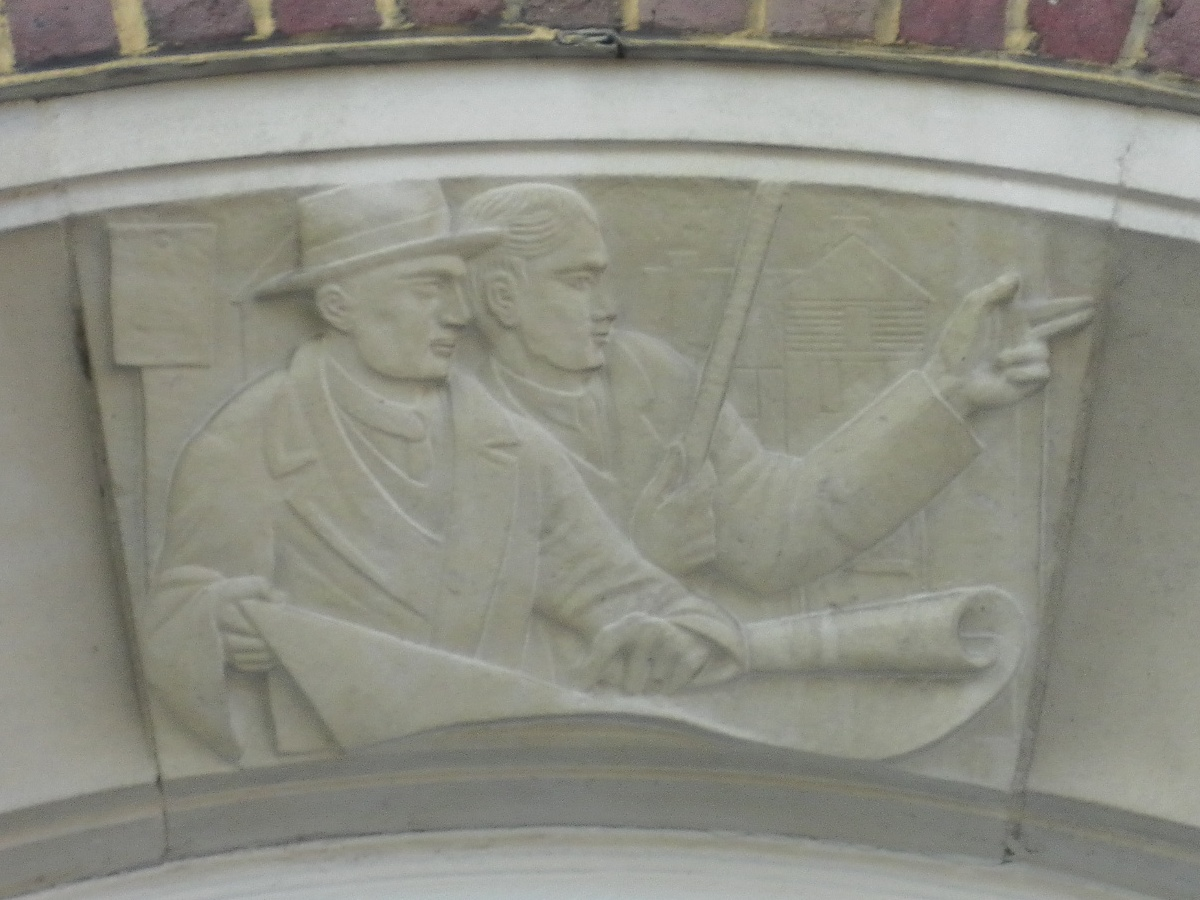
- Denman depicted (left) in relief form at 20–22 Marlborough Place, Brighton
- Born: 15 November 1882; Brighton
- Died: 5 June 1975 (aged 92); Brighton
- Education: Brighton Grammar School; LCC Central School of Arts & Crafts
- Occupation: Architect
- Practice: Denman & Son
- Buildings: Brighton & Hove Herald offices, Brighton; Citizens' Permanent Building Society, Brighton; Royal Masonic Institute for Girls, Rickmansworth; Sussex Eye Hospital, Brighton
- Projects: St Michael and All Angels Church, Southwick (rebuild); St Peter's Church, West Blatchington (rebuild)

John Leopold Denman FRIBA (15 November 1882 – 5 June 1975) was an architect from the English seaside resort of Brighton, now part of the city of Brighton and Hove. He had a prolific career in the area during the 20th century, both on his own and as part of the Denman & Son firm in partnership with his son John Bluet Denman. Described as "the master of ... mid-century Neo-Georgian", Denman was responsible for a range of commercial, civic and religious buildings in Brighton, and pubs and hotels there and elsewhere on the south coast of England on behalf of Brighton's Kemp Town Brewery. He used other architectural styles as well, and was responsible for at least one mansion, several smaller houses, various buildings in cemeteries and crematoria, and alterations to many churches. His work on church restorations has been praised, and he has been called "the leading church architect of his time in Sussex"; he also wrote a book on the ecclesiastical architecture of the county.

Denman often worked with sculptor Joseph Cribb, whose carved reliefs (including one depicting Denman himself) adorn several of his buildings. As a long-serving member of the Brighton School of Art—where he was head of the Architecture department—he also influenced the careers of former pupils who were later associated with the large group of artists who lived and worked in nearby Ditchling, where Cribb was based. English Heritage has awarded some of Denman's works listed status in view of their architectural importance: among them are an elaborate Byzantine Revival mausoleum, an "elegant" Neo-Georgian office building and a pair of ceremonial stone pylons on the city boundary.

== Biography ==
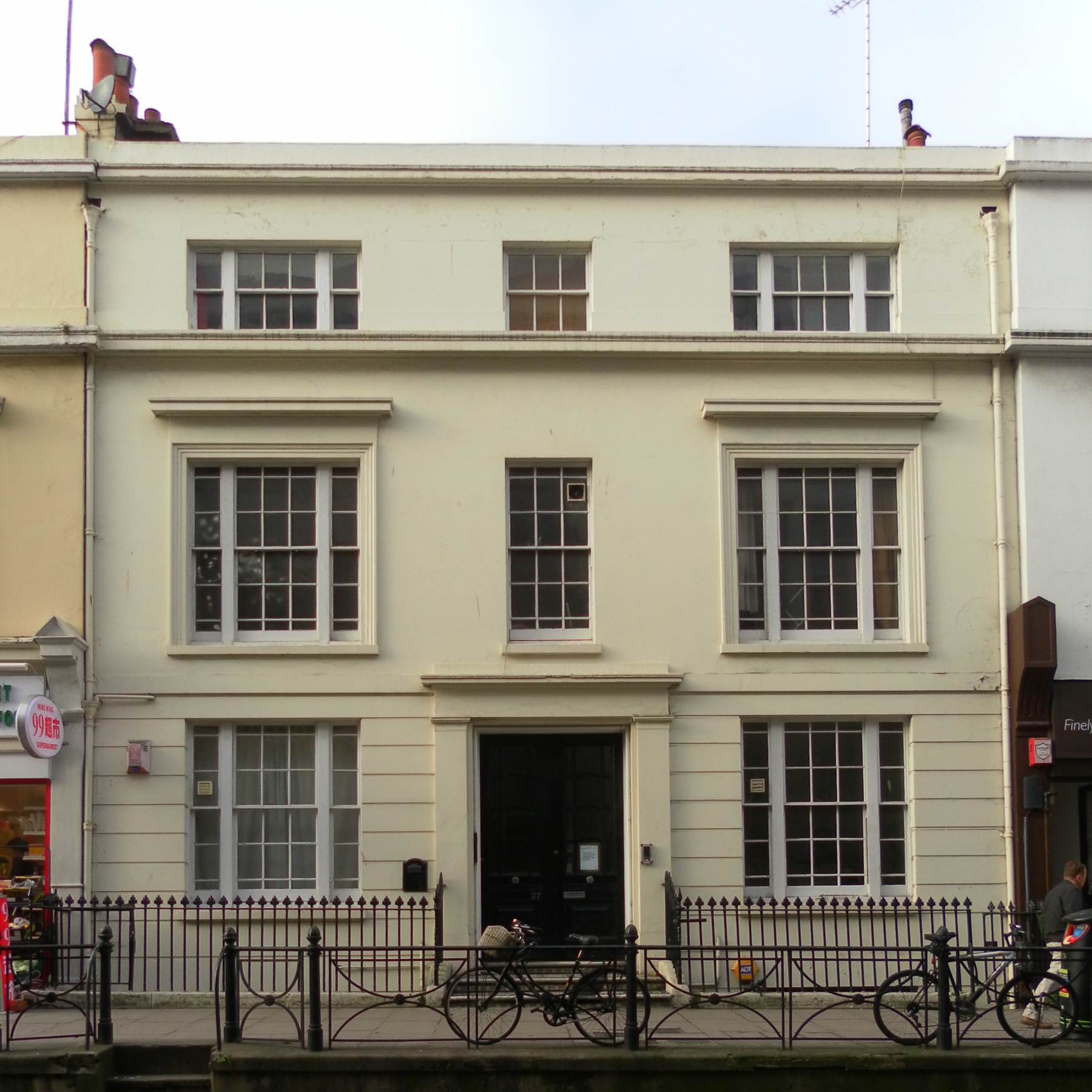
Denman's practice was based at 27 Queens Road, Brighton.

Denman was born on 15 November 1882 in Brighton. His grandfather was also an architect who had remodelled St Paul's Church in West Street, Brighton, and his father Samuel Denman (who died in 1945) was also based in Brighton and designed buildings including Lewes Town Hall and the Jacobean-style Hove Club (1897) at Fourth Avenue, Hove. (Note: He is described in the Directory of British Architects as "presumably" related to Samuel Denman.) Denman junior studied at Brighton Grammar School and the London County Council (LCC) Central School of Arts and Crafts, and was articled to his father in 1898 at the age of 16. His professional career as an architect began in 1907: (Note: A house at 7 Wilbury Crescent, Hove (1903) has been attributed to "Denman & Son", which presumably refers to Samuel and John. It was designed to the specifications of Charles and Averil Burleigh, and was one of the first buildings in this street when completed in 1907. Unusually, it forms part of a non-matching pair of semi-detached houses. Another feature is the "huge north-facing window in the attic space".) he became an assistant at the firm of Jones & Smithers, studied for his professional qualifications (which he received in 1908) and was accepted as an Associate of the Royal Institute of British Architects (ARIBA) on 1 March 1909. His first working address, from that year, was 27 Queens Road, Brighton—the premises from which Samuel Denman had operated since 1896 or earlier. John Leopold Denman's later addresses included 8 Clifton Hill, in the Montpelier area of Brighton, and The Knoll in the Withdean area.

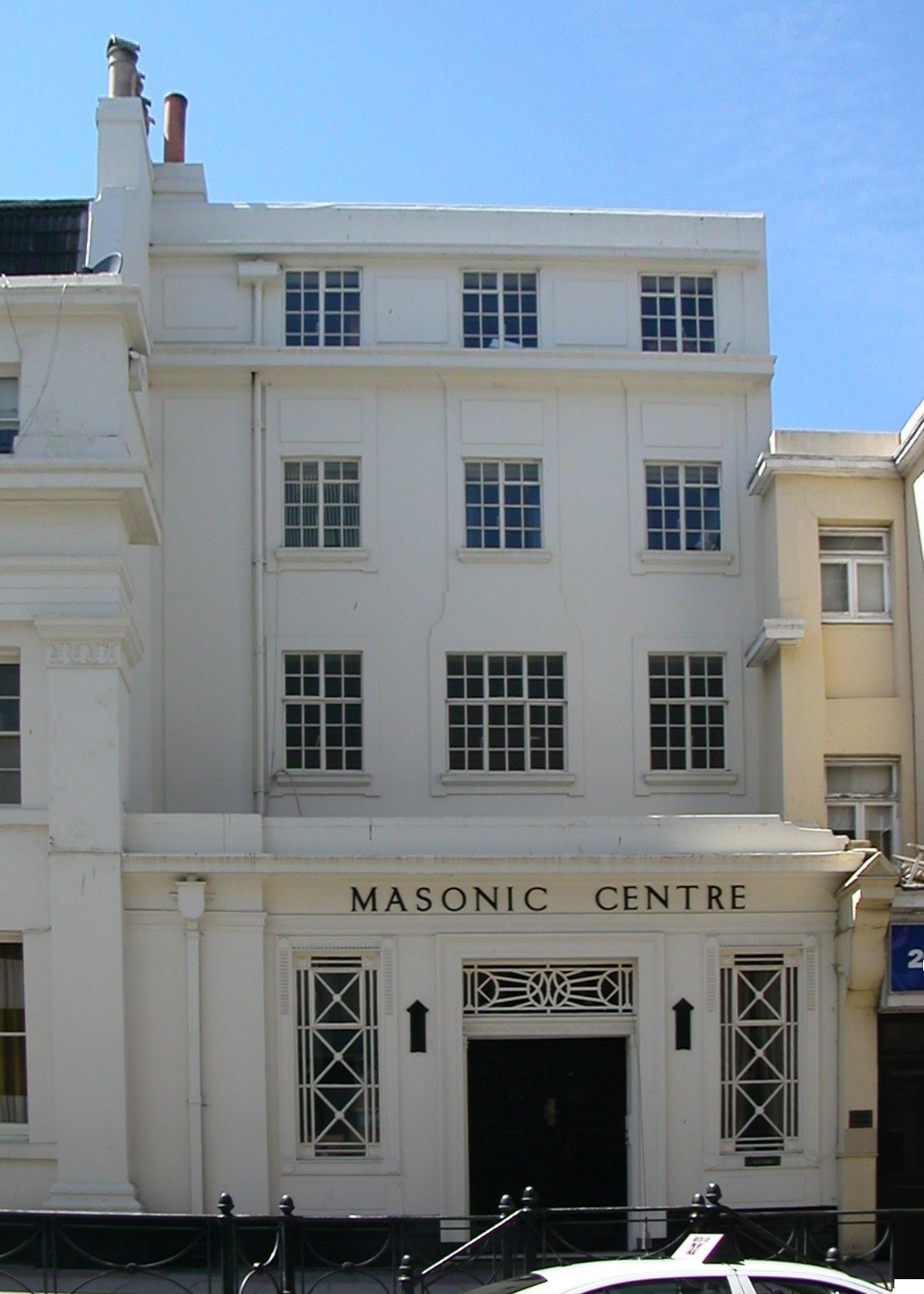
The Sussex Masonic Centre, 25 Queen's Road, Brighton

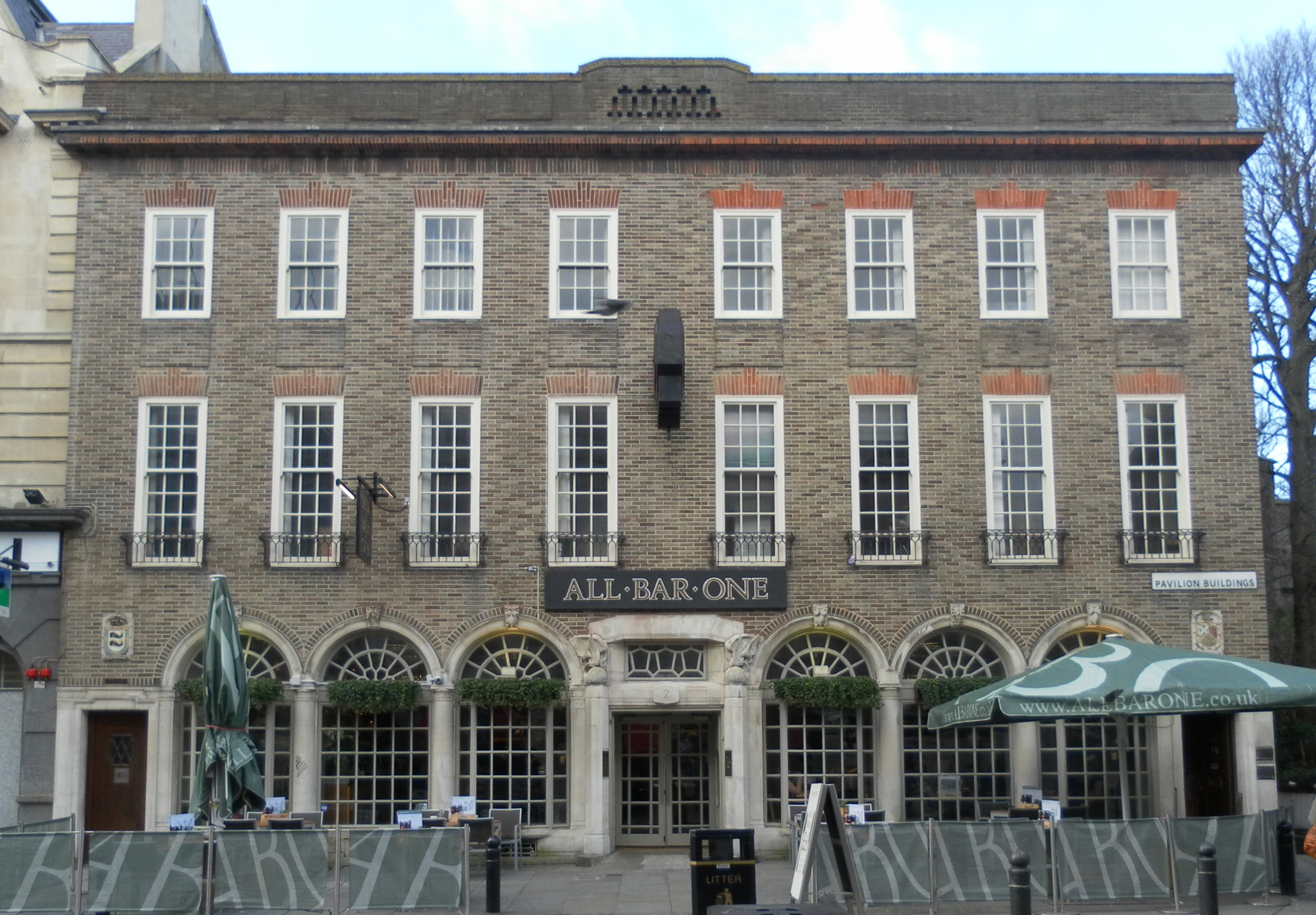
The former Brighton & Hove Herald offices, Brighton

During the 1920s, Denman led the Architecture department of the Brighton School of Art (now part of the University of Brighton)—a faculty he was associated with for many years. He was also elected president of a regional body, the South-Eastern Society of Architects. During his time at the School of Art, he influenced the career development of landscape artist Charles Knight, who studied there between 1919 and 1923, and portrait artist and stained glass designer Louis Ginnett. Around this time, he was also engaged by the Kemp Town Brewery in Brighton to be their in-house architect, responsible for designing new pubs and hotels in Sussex and other southern counties of England; and further afield, he won the commission to design the Royal Masonic Institution for Girls in Rickmansworth, Hertfordshire. Work on this building (now a school) took place between 1928 and 1933, and its chapel is a listed building. Between 1922 and 1927, he was responsible for a small number of houses in various streets in Hove: Rochester Gardens, Montefiore Road, Colbourne Road and New Church Road.

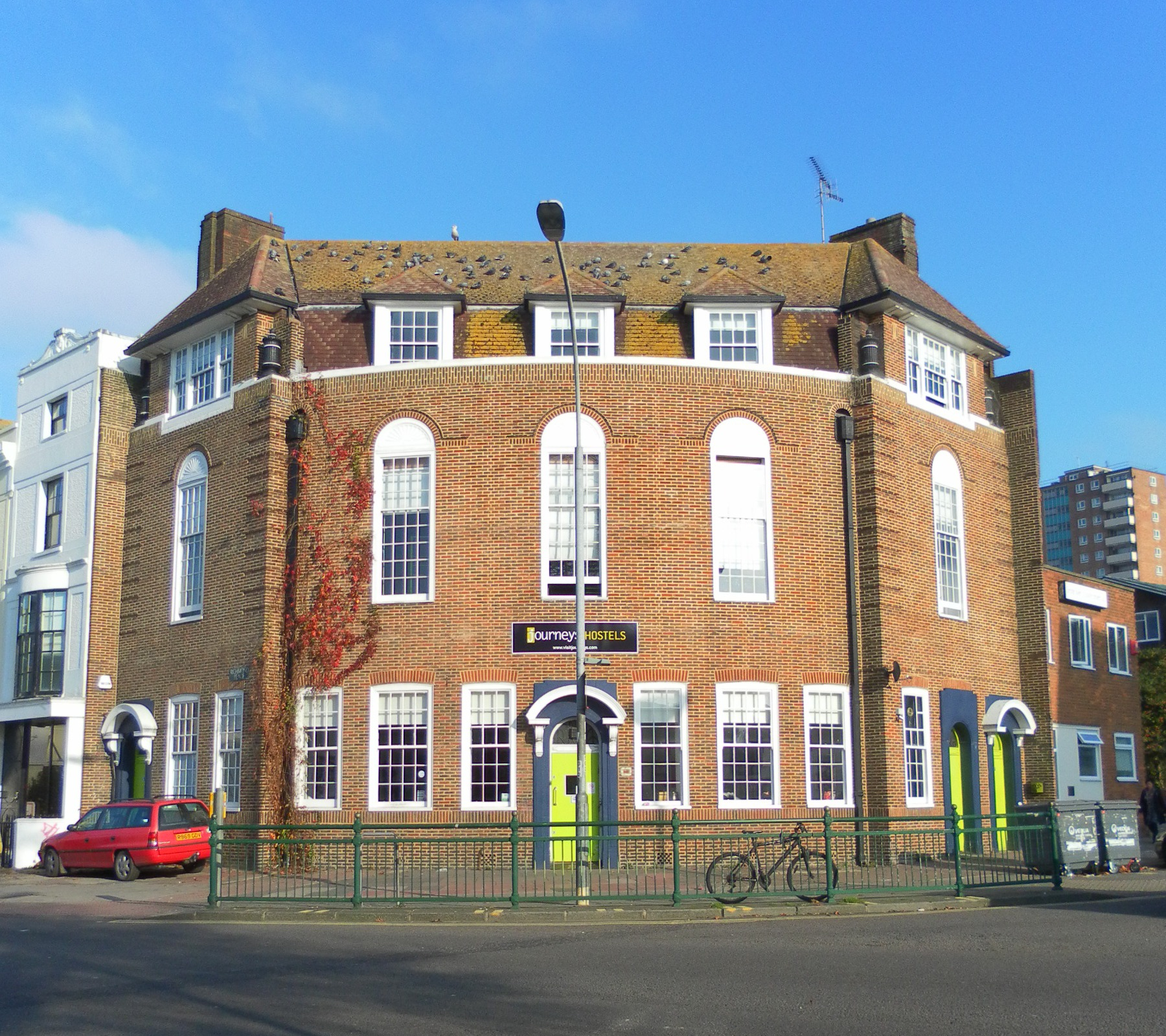
The former Richmond Hotel, Brighton

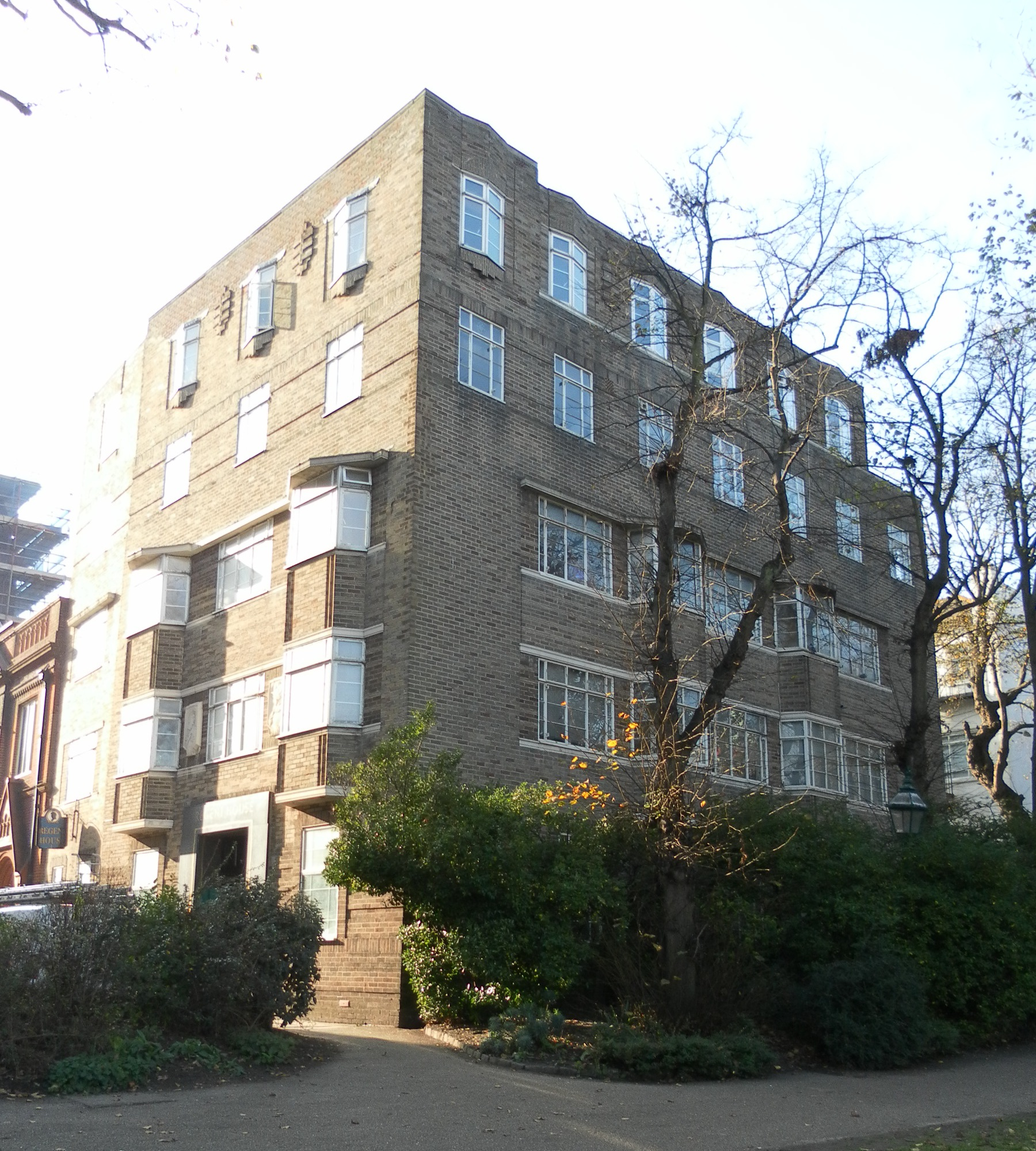
Regent House, Brighton

Denman's first commissions in Brighton were for civic structures to commemorate the creation in 1928 of the Borough of Brighton. (This greatly enlarged the town's urban area and gave it borough status.) He designed two stone pylons which flanked the main London Road at the new borough boundary north of Patcham, and a commemorative stone seat at Devil's Dyke, a beauty spot on the South Downs overlooking Brighton (although the seat faced northwards, away from the town). Both structures were commissioned by Sir Herbert Carden, a local councillor, and were unveiled on 30 May 1928. Both have extensive carved reliefs and inscriptions—a feature Denman often used in his later work as well. Throughout his career he worked with sculptors and other craftsmen from Ditchling, a village near Brighton which was home to an art colony, The Guild of St Joseph and St Dominic. (Both Charles Knight and Louis Ginnett were loosely associated with the Guild, although they were not official members, and Ginnett is believed to have worked with Denman on the pylons.) Another early work was his redesigning and substantial extension of the Sussex Masonic Centre at 25 Queen's Road, next door to his father's office, in 1928. The local Freemasons had bought the building, a mid 19th-century house, and the surrounding site nine years earlier with the aim of turning it into their local headquarters. Denman's design included some Art Deco elements.

By the late 1920s, Brighton had evolved into a major commercial centre. To a much greater extent than in other places, its commercial and civic buildings were typically designed by locals rather than outside architects, and there was a surge in demand for new commercial premises in the 1930s. In 1930, Denman took over his father's architectural practice at Queen's Road, and over the next few years he was commissioned to design several major commercial buildings in Brighton. His Neo-Georgian offices for the Citizen's Permanent Building Society on Marlborough Place were finished in 1932, by which time construction of the Richmond Hotel and bar had started. This building, on Richmond Parade opposite Marlborough Place, was also Neo-Georgian in style and was finished in 1934. On side roads off North Street in the town centre, Denman designed Neo-Georgian offices for the Brighton & Hove Herald newspaper in 1934 and Regent House—in a similar style but with angular Modernist elements—in the same year, immediately behind the Chapel Royal. In 1935, he designed a "blocky", prominent brick building to house the Sussex Eye Hospital. A year later, he submitted a plan to redesign Brighton Town Hall, but Brighton Borough Council rejected it. Two years later, he designed a holiday home in South Heighton near Newhaven on behalf of the Guinness Trust. It was used to give tenants of the Trust's housing in London a cheap seaside holiday. The building was requisitioned during World War II and later served as a WRVS club and home before being partly demolished in the 1990s. On behalf of the Congregational Church, he designed the Hounsom Memorial Church for the new Hangleton housing estate in Hove in 1938. It opened the following year and is still used by the United Reformed Church. In 1938 he was also engaged at Eridge Park, home of the Marquesses of Abergavenny, who commissioned him to design a new mansion to replace Eridge Castle—an "exuberant" Gothic Revival house of 1787. Denman's replacement building, Eridge Park House, is still occupied by the family.

Denman also undertook small schemes to design internal features and fittings for buildings, such as his work at Preston Manor. Preston was a Saxon village which became a suburb of Brighton in the 19th century. Its ancient manor house, Preston Manor, was rebuilt several times, most substantially in 1905. At some point after this date, Denman designed an alcove at the bottom of the main staircase. Other small schemes, both under the Denman & Son name, were carried out at St Paul's Church (a sounding board for the pulpit, designed in about 1960) and St Peter's Church, the parish church of Brighton (a "fine" organ case dated 1966).

During the 1940s, Denman's work was exhibited at the Royal Academy of Arts, and locally he served as a Justice of the Peace in East Sussex. In December 1945, he was a founding member of The Regency Society, an influential preservation society which campaigned against the planned demolition of large areas of Regency-era buildings on Brighton and Hove seafront. By this time he had been designated a Fellow of the Royal Institute of British Architects (FRIBA), and he later became president of the Society. By the 1950s he was also working as architect to the Dean and Chapter of Canterbury. In 1967, Denman wrote A short survey of the structural development of Sussex churches on behalf of the Sussex Historic Churches Trust, a 63-page guide to the architectural history of the county's churches. He died on 5 June 1975.

Denman wrote a set of memoirs which, although not formally published, are held by the RIBA in their British Architectural Library. Among other things, he noted that he was summoned by the Bishop of Chichester George Bell in the early 1950s to discuss proposed designs for a permanent church at Peacehaven, a rapidly growing residential area east of Brighton which only had a temporary building for worship. Bishop Bell disliked the first submission, by a builder with no architectural training; Denman advised him to reject it and a second design submitted by another man. Architect L. Keir Hett was eventually commissioned, although Denman himself submitted a design.

== Works ==
=== New buildings ===
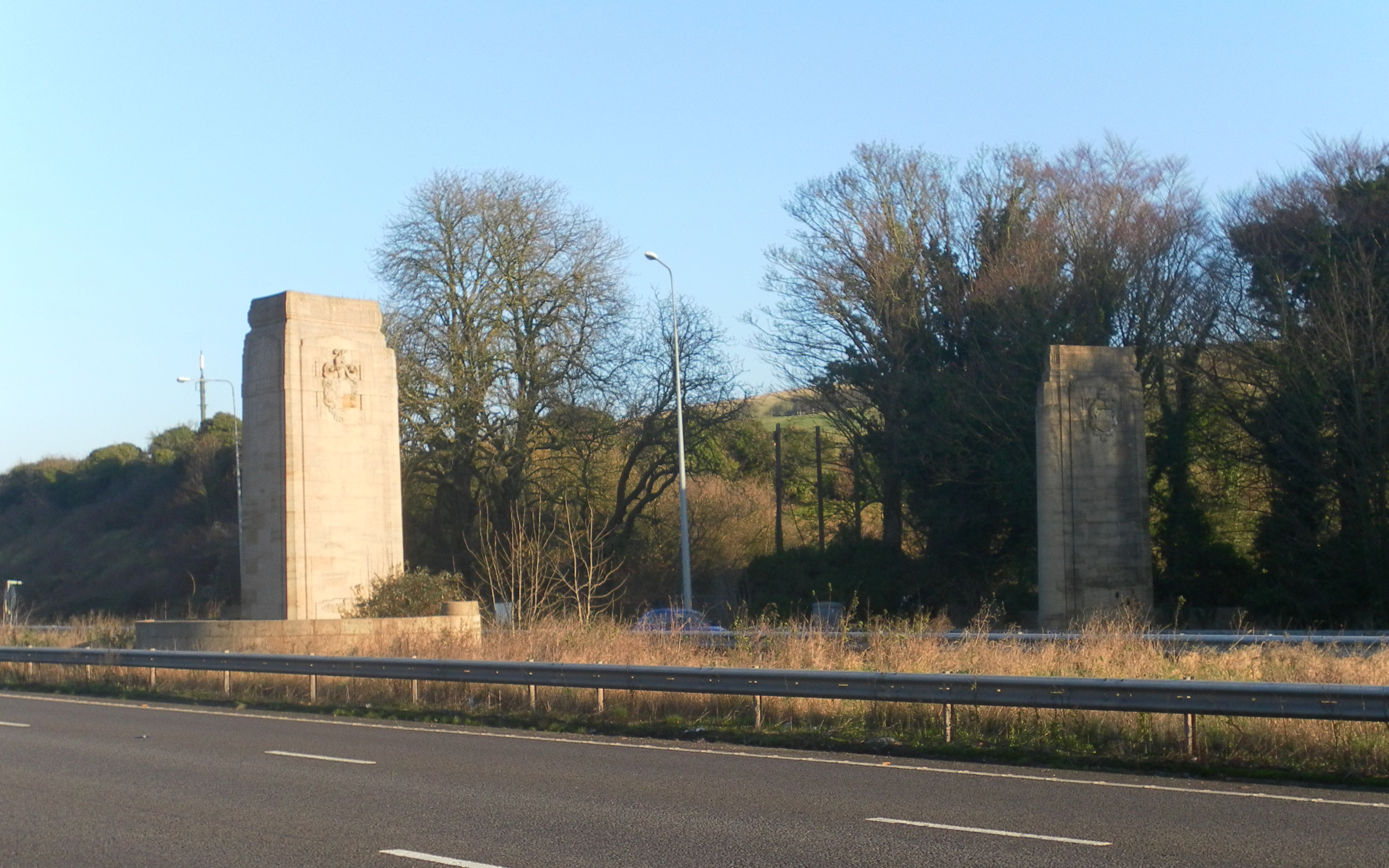
The Patcham Pylons

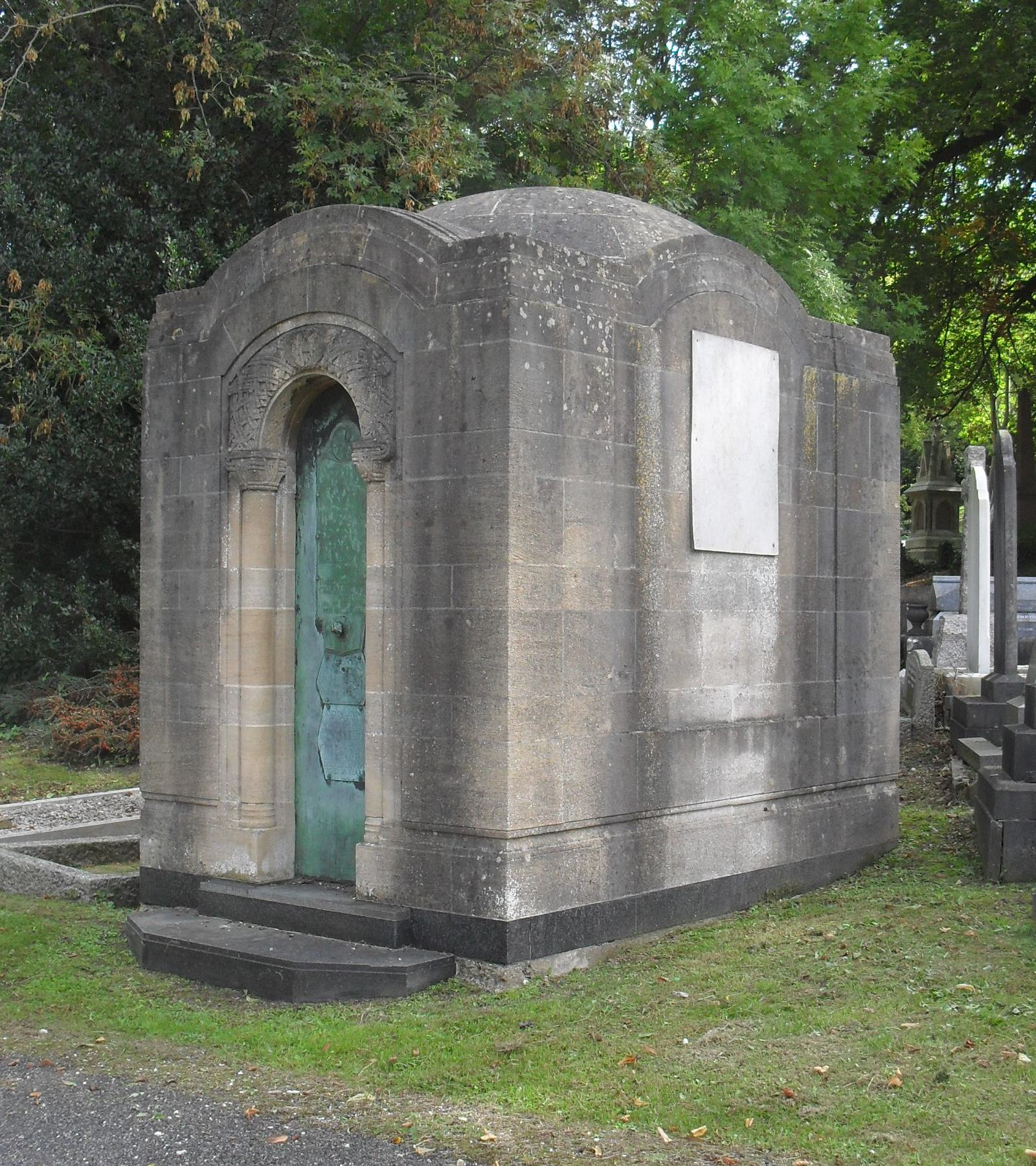
Baldwin family Mausoleum (c. 1930)

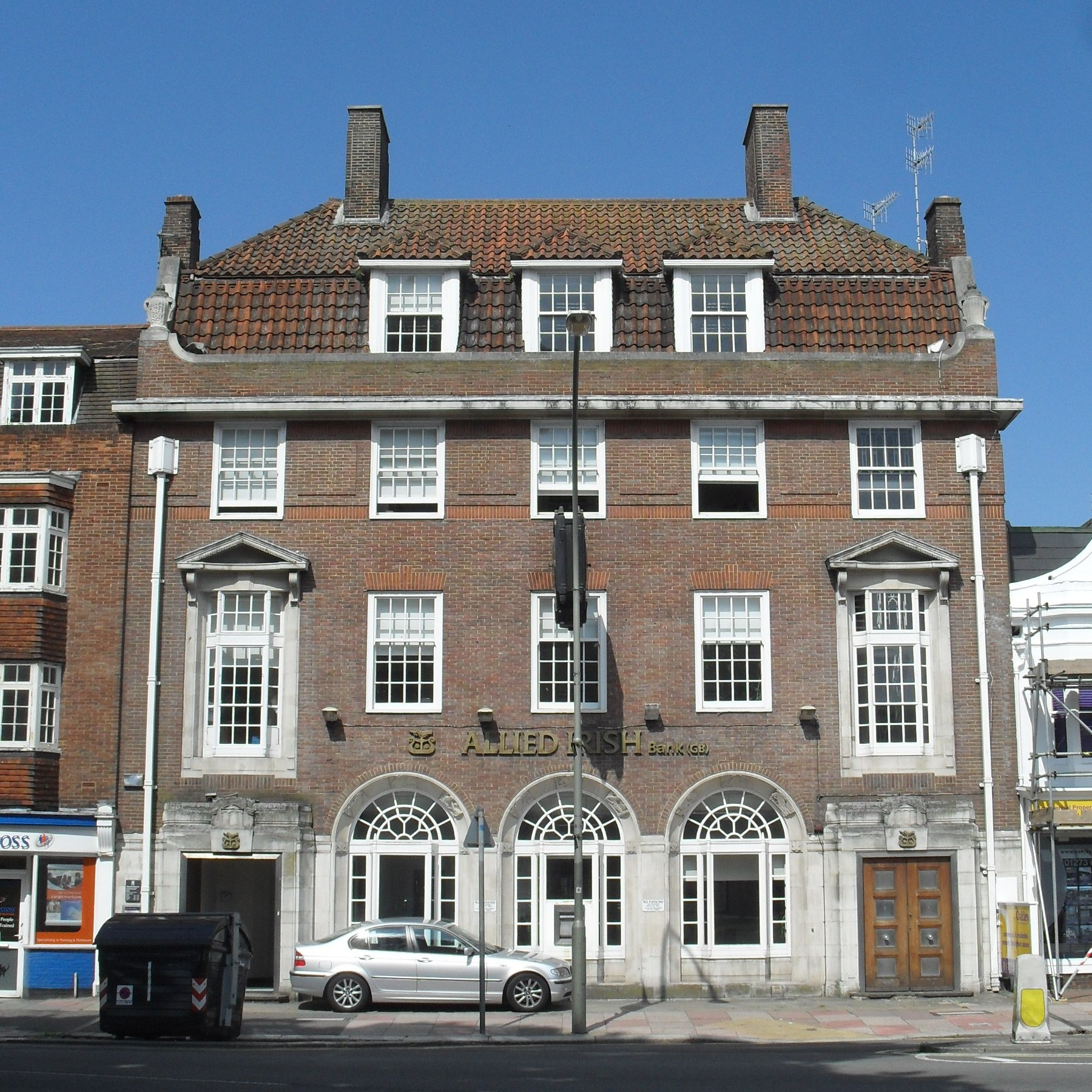
20–22 Marlborough Place, Brighton (1933)

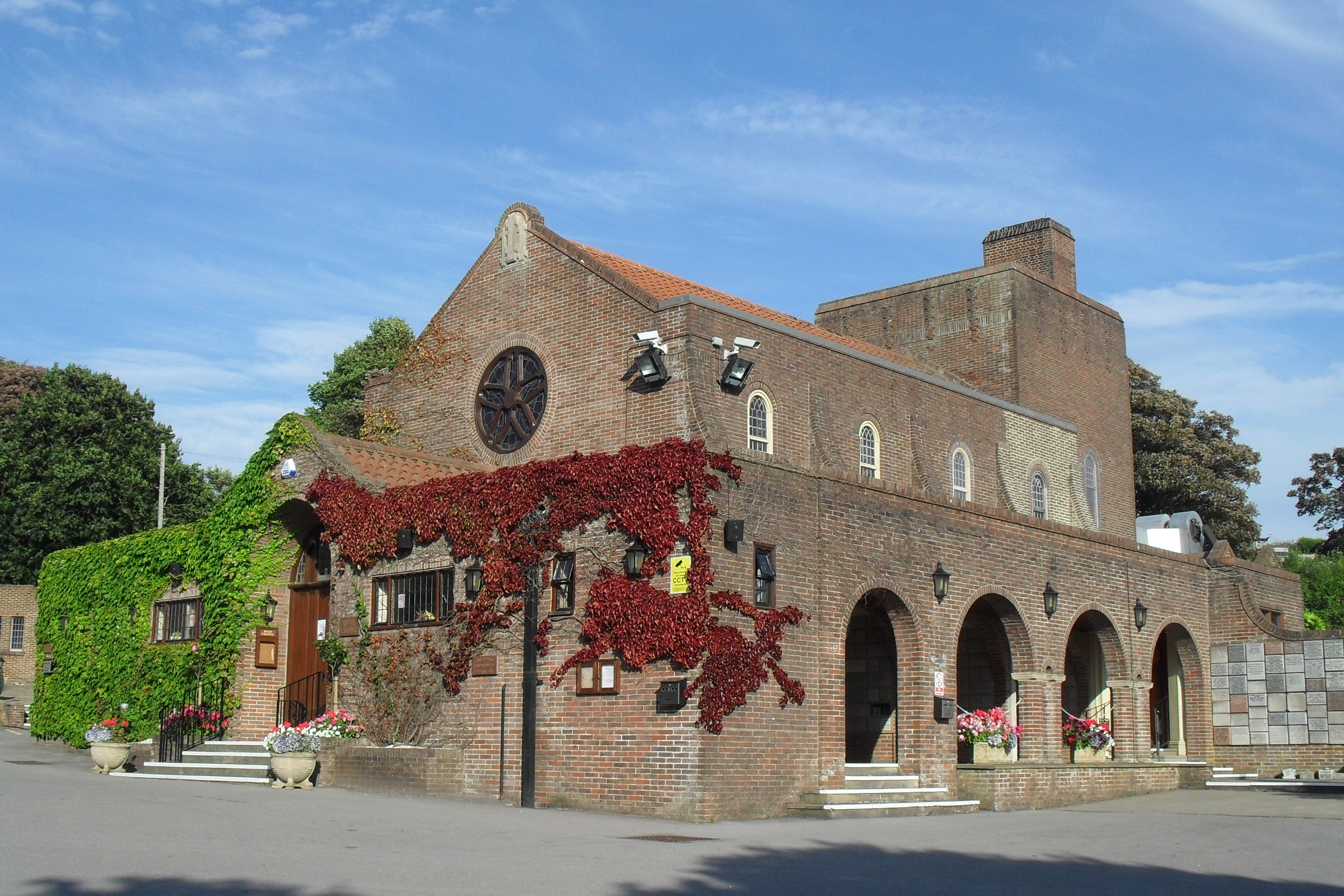
Downs Crematorium (1941)

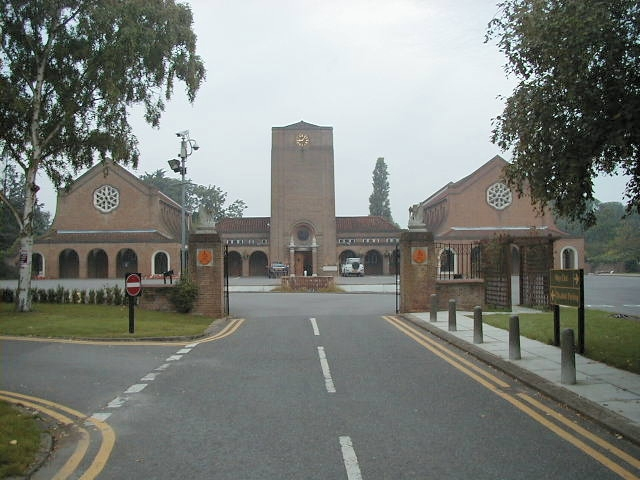
South West Middlesex Crematorium, Feltham (1946)

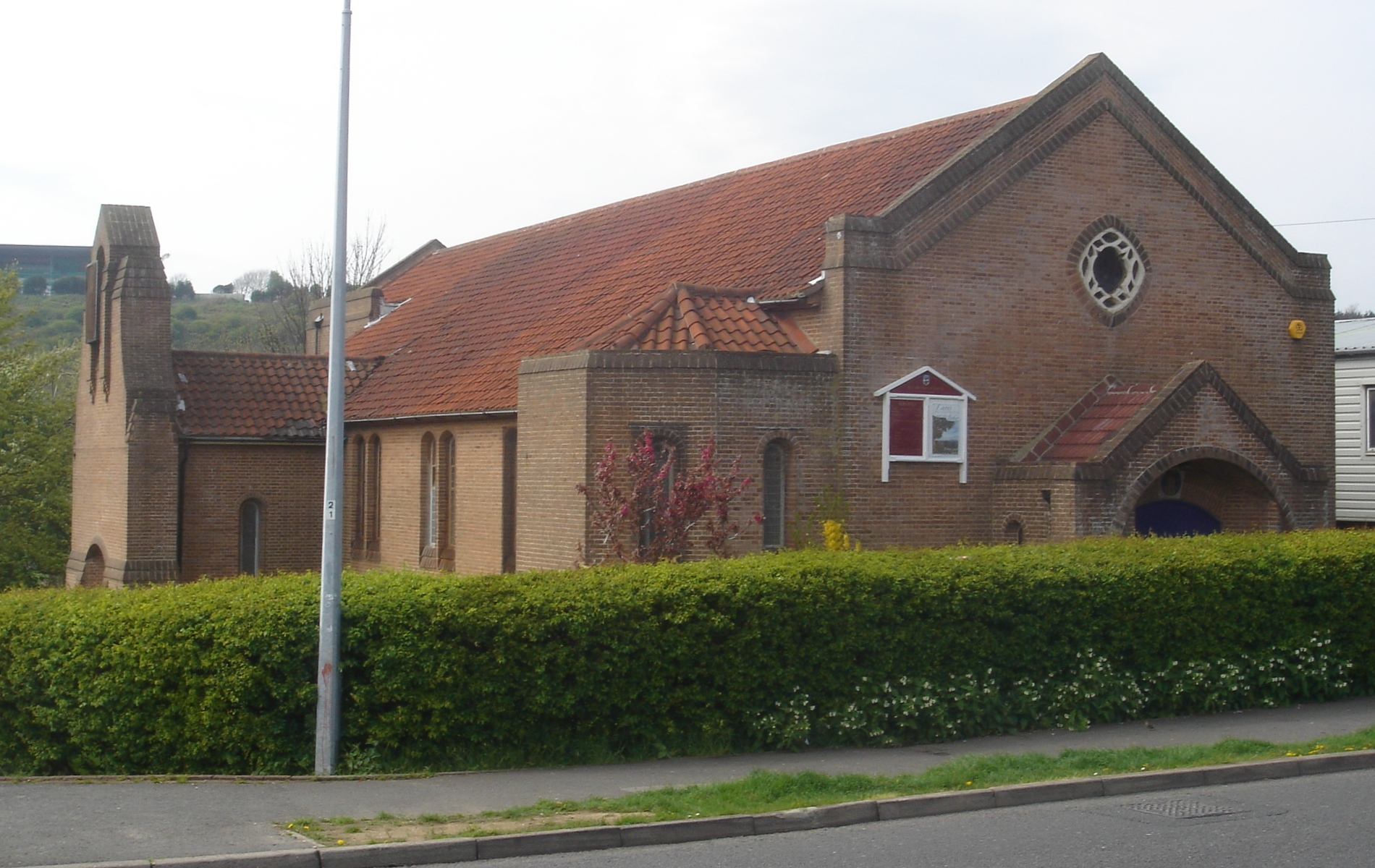
St Cuthman's Church, Whitehawk (1952)

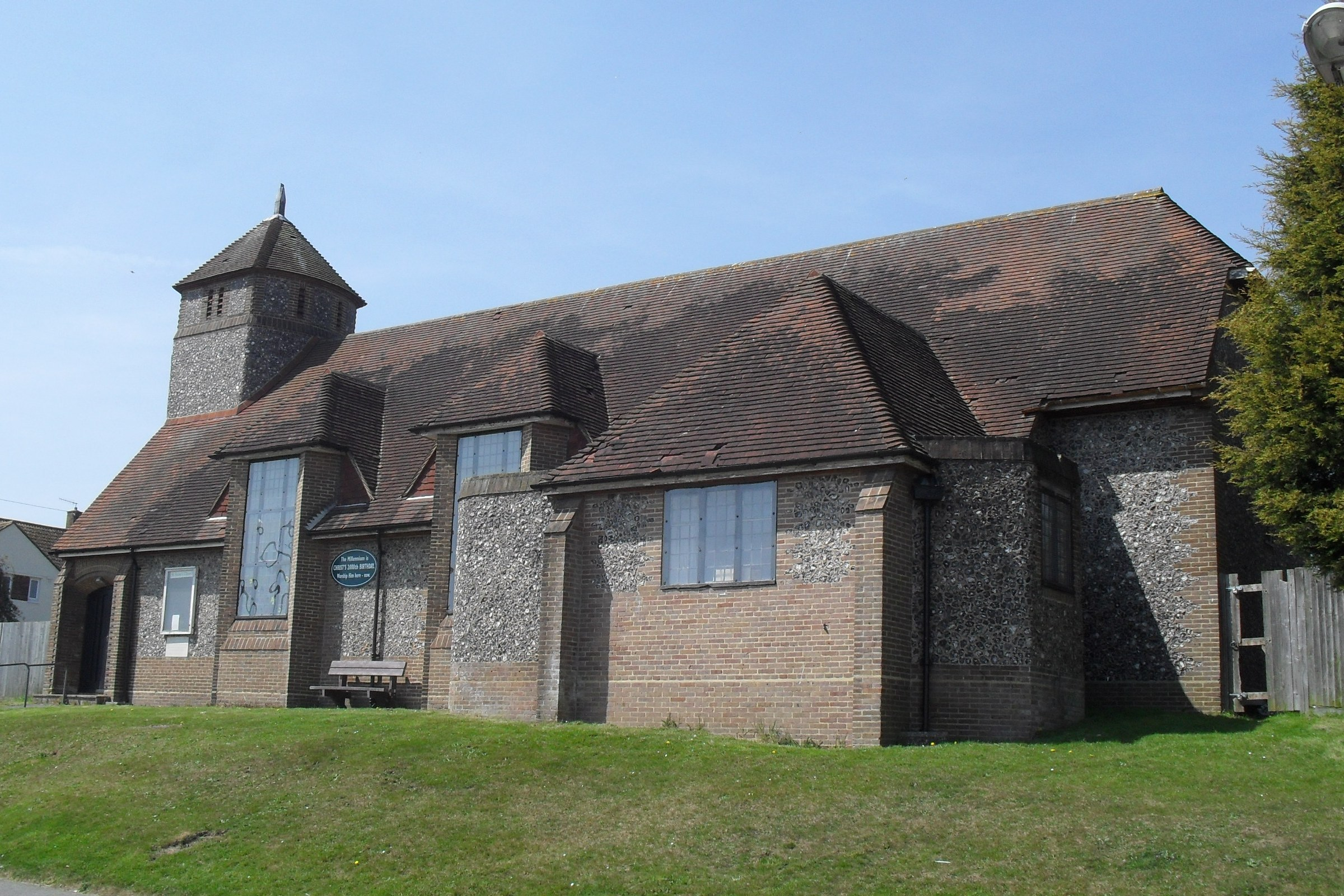
St Anne's Church, Hollington (1956–1965)

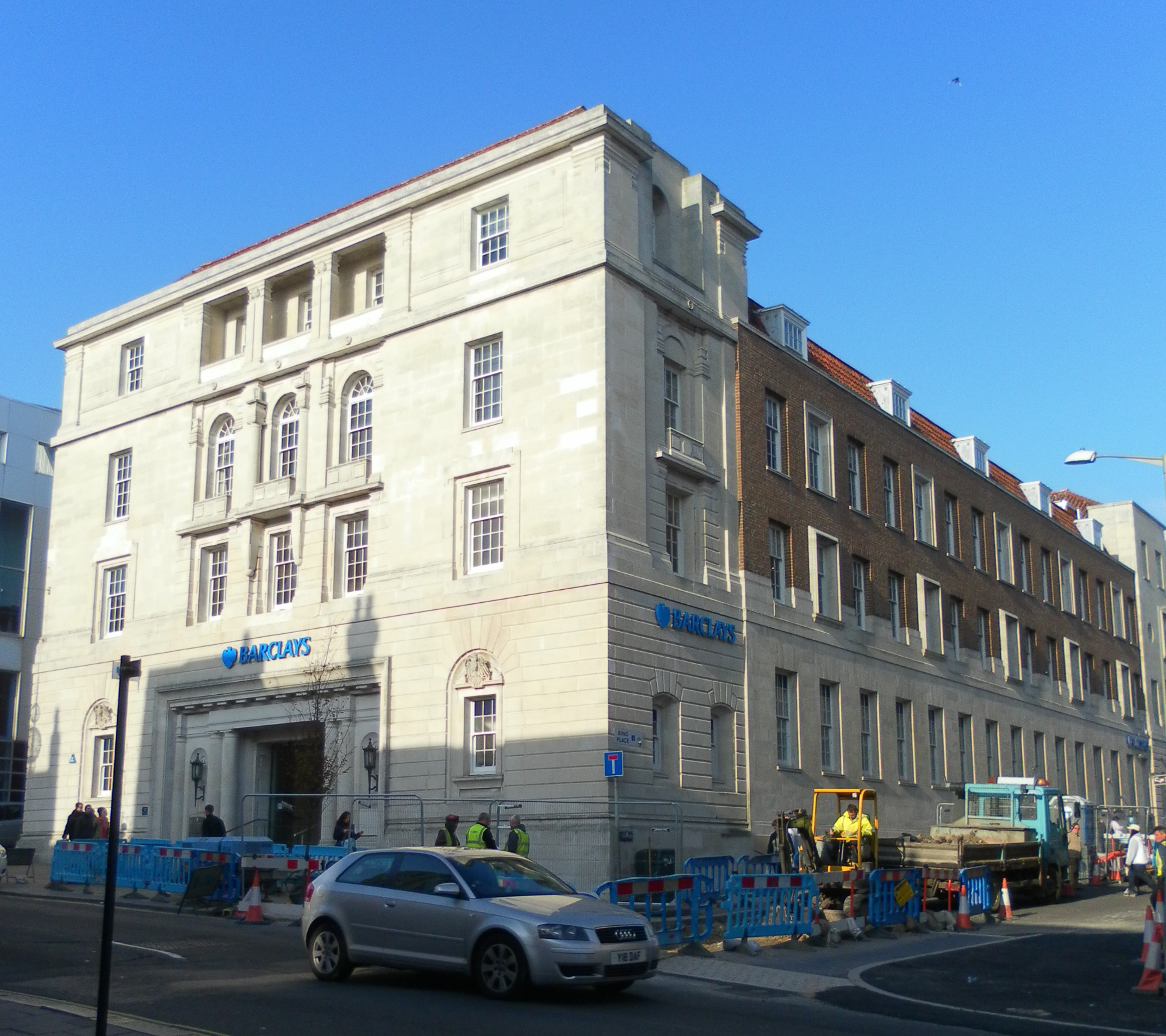
Barclays Bank, North Street, Brighton (1957–59)

Tally Ho Inn, Church Street, Old Town, Eastbourne (1927; Grade II-listed)

This Kemp Town Brewery pub is a "striking" and distinctive Arts and Crafts/Sussex Vernacular building on a prominent corner site. Materials include handmade red bricks, tiles and knapped flint, and there are tiled gables, oriel windows, ornate lamps and linenfold carving. Denman also designed the Dolphin Inn (not listed) in the town's South Street at the same time.

Maytree Pub, Old Shoreham Road, Aldrington (1928)

Denman's design for this pub, on behalf of the Kemp Town Brewery, was approved by Hove Council in January 1928. It was recorded in 1931 as the Maytree Hotel. Conquest Inns, its owner in 2000, closed the pub and it was demolished in that year in favour of housing.

Brewers Arms Pub, London Road, Burgess Hill (1928)

Another pub for the Kemp Town Brewery, this was designed in a style reminiscent of "a Georgian town house".

The Pylons, Patcham (1928; Grade II-listed)

Councillor Sir Herbert Carden commissioned these "wedge-shaped" stone structures to flank the main London Road at the boundary of the newly extended Borough of Brighton in 1928. He paid £2,255 towards them, and the public raised a further £993. Because the road is now a dual carriageway, one pylon now "stands forlornly in the central reservation, although a third is planned". The pylons are of limestone with slightly concave north and south faces. Small buttresses protrude at the corners. Carvings and inscriptions include the coat of arms of the Duke and Duchess of York, who laid the foundation stone, the emblems of Brighton and Sussex, a female figure and a galleon. Details of the date, architect, builders, founders and other descriptive information, and a short poem, are also carved on the flat panels which are mounted on the concave faces. Next to each pylon is a seat, also made of stone and wrapping around but not touching the base. They are about 3 1/2 feet (1.1 m) off the ground, supported on small columns, and have decorative moulding. They are separately listed at Grade II.

Commemorative seat at Devil's Dyke, near Poynings (1928)

Sir Herbert Carden again commissioned and partly paid for this seat on the South Downs above Brighton, on a 190-acre (77 ha) area of land he had bought for £9,000 to preserve for posterity. The structure is of limestone and has the Borough of Brighton's coat of arms carved on one side. The words god gave all men all earth to love and a dedication to the Duke of York are inscribed on the opposite side. Decorative paving surrounds the seat.

Royal Masonic Institute for Girls, Rickmansworth (1928–33; chapel Grade II-listed)

The school is a large complex completed over the course of several years. Its chapel, which is listed, is in a Free Byzantine Revival style with prominent aisles and arched windows. The walls are of plum-coloured brick with some stonework, such as on the buttresses, gables and architraves.

Duke of Wellington pub, Brighton Road, Shoreham-by-Sea (1929)

Another pub for the Kemp Town Brewery, this was a "striking Neo-Jacobean design".

Baldwin Mausoleum, Brighton Extra Mural Cemetery, Brighton (c. 1930; Grade II-listed)

This mausoleum, whose construction date is unknown (although the first Baldwin family member named on it died in 1935), is also Byzantine Revival in style. It is cruciform in shape and has a domed top, transepts and stone walls. There is a cornice interrupted by rounded mouldings, an arched entrance flanked by columns with decorative capitals and a recessed bronze door. Four family members are commemorated on inscribed bronze panels.

Richmond Hotel (now Pressure Point), Richmond Place, Brighton (1931–34)

This has a curved façade which rounds the corner from Grand Parade to Richmond Place. It is a "nicely composed and detailed Neo-Georgian" building distinguished by unusually large arched windows on the upper floor.

20–22 Marlborough Place, Brighton (1933; Grade II-listed)

This "well-mannered and individual" three-storey building has a symmetrical Neo-Georgian façade of brick. The roof is tiled and there is some exterior stonework. The windows and doorcases at ground-floor level form a round-arched arcade; in the architraves of the windows are intricate carved reliefs by Joseph Cribb depicting workers in the building trade. The leftmost carving shows a hat-wearing Denman himself, holding a set of architectural plans and talking to another man.

Regent House, Prince's Place, Brighton (1933)

Principally Neo-Georgian in style, this office has some Modernist elements: "modishly angular canopies" above its irregularly placed oriel windows (which are of the Crittall steel-framed type), and curiously patterned brickwork giving the impression of pointillism.

Offices of the Brighton & Hove Herald, 2–3 Pavilion Buildings, Brighton (1933–34)

Now the All Bar One bar and previously used by Royal Insurance, this "very stylish and well-detailed" Neo-Georgian brick building was originally the head office of a local newspaper. It has a bow-fronted arcade of sash windows. Joseph Cribb was responsible for its carved Portland stone capitals depicting scallops and seahorses.

Sussex Eye Hospital, Eastern Road, Brighton (1935)

Part of the extensive Royal Sussex County Hospital campus, whose oldest buildings were designed by Charles Barry in the 1820s, Denman's contribution consists of a "blocky" u-shaped Neo-Georgian building of polychrome brick and a little stone. The recessed entrance bay projects upwards as a tower.

Grenadier Pub, Hangleton (1935)

Built by Denman for the Kemp Town Brewery, this prominently sited suburban pub has stone decorations on its façade, described as "peculiar stylised urns surmounted by ... a squat burst of flames". Stone carvings in the architraves of the first-floor windows depict hops and barley. As originally designed, the interior was elaborately furnished with walnut wood, oak, soft leather and silk. A 1935 datestone is visible on the exterior.

St Richard's Flats, Church Road, Portslade (mid-1930s)

This small block of flats near St Andrew's Church has locally listed status. Brighton & Hove City Council describe it as "cottagey and jazzy at the same time, a building of class and character". The exterior is render, each flat has a wooden balcony and the roof is laid with clay tiles.

Eridge Park House, Eridge (1938)

Denman built this on behalf of the Marquess of Abergavenny on the site of a late 18th-century building which had in turn replaced an earlier house. Built in 1787 by an amateur architect, the former Eridge Castle was an ostentatious castellated house which was described as "in the worst possible taste" in 1877. Nikolaus Pevsner lamented its demolition, though. In 1958, the new house was partly demolished. Eridge Park itself is an extensive stretch of Wealden land which was originally a medieval deer park owned by Odo, Earl of Kent (half-brother of William the Conqueror).

Hounsom Memorial Church, Hangleton (1938)

The name commemorated Sussex businessman and Congregationalist William Allin Hounsom. Denman explained his design at the inaugural reception: "[there are] aisles and clerestory windows without those divisional units which usually separate aisles from the central part of the church ... cost meant the tower could not be too imposing ... there is panel heating along the ceiling". Dark brick and red roof tiles from the Ringmer brickworks were used in the design, and there are three "startling" carved stone reliefs on the exterior: Saint Christopher, a pelican and a lamb. Denman & Son also built the adjacent church hall in 1951. Two years before this, they built a similar hall in Saltdean, which was used as a church by Presbyterians until a permanent church (St Martin's; now also United Reformed) was built in 1957.

Downs Crematorium, Brighton (1941)

This was built for the Brighton and Preston Cemetery Co. Ltd, a private company which had developed its own cemetery in Brighton alongside those owned by the Borough Council. Hilary Grainger, a historian of crematorium architecture, stated that the building was inspired by the design of the nearby St Wilfrid's Church (designed in 1932 by Harry Stuart Goodhart-Rendel). The chapel has a cloister with a memorial garden.

Goring-by-Sea Methodist Church, Goring-by-Sea (1951)

Denman's long, low brick building has a small bronze spire. It was provided for Methodists in this suburb of Worthing, who had previously worshipped in a local hall.

Mile Oak Inn, Mile Oak Road, Mile Oak (after 1951)

Denman submitted designs for this pub on the Mile Oak estate north of Portslade on 25 January 1951. It was built for the Kemp Town Brewery.

St Cuthman's Church, Whitehawk, Brighton (1951–52)

Denman's church for the Whitehawk housing estate in the east of Brighton replaced one built in 1937 and destroyed by a World War II bomb six years later. It is of red brick with a pantiled roof, a side porch and a gable on which a bellcote is mounted.

South West Middlesex Crematorium, Feltham (1952–54)

In February 1946, Denman was commissioned by the South West Middlesex Crematorium Joint Board (formed by councillors from several urban districts in Middlesex) to design a crematorium for a site at Hanworth in the district of Feltham. Building work did not start until 1952, though. There were two chapels with cloisters of unequal size flanking a tower with the hall of remembrance inside. Various other buildings were also provided on the site. It was dedicated in 1954.

St Richard's Church (original building), Maybridge estate, Goring-by-Sea (1954)

The church Denman built on this postwar housing estate in 1954 was superseded by a larger building in 1966 and is now the church hall. It is a simple dark brick building with Vernacular-style windows and a west-end entrance set under a pointed arch. The ends are gabled.

Southwick Methodist Church Hall, Southwick (1954)

Denman was responsible for this church hall, which was used as a Methodist church between the demolition of the congregation's original premises at Albion Street and the opening in 1966 of the permanent church next to the hall. Another architect, W.J. Thrasher, was commissioned to design this.

Friends Meeting House, Canterbury (1956)

Denman designed a replacement for the Quaker community's original meeting house, which had been destroyed by a bomb in World War II. He provided a "domestic Arts and Crafts-style" building consisting of two parts: the hall and other accommodation on the right, with a steep tiled hipped roof, straight-head sash windows and a wide arched entrance porch, and the worship space on the left with two arched windows.

Harewood Court, Wilbury Road, Hove (1956, as Denman & Son)

This was the first housing built for the Royal Masonic Benevolent Institution. Denman drew up the designs in 1947, and clearance of the site (formerly a farm) had started in the 1930s, but construction did not take place until 1956. A "strongly built" seven-storey block of flats with elements of Modernism, it consists of two parallel street-facing towers whose corners are recessed in stages, joined by a five-storey bow-fronted section. Communal and social facilities were originally in this part. Stock brick was the building material.

St Anne's Church, Hollington, Hastings (1956–1965, as Denman & Son)

Described as "typical of their work at the time", this flint and brick church in a postwar suburb of Hastings was designed by Denman and his son and was built over the course of several years. The windows extend past the roofline to form dormers, and there is a small tower with bowed walls. The church is in the parish of Church in the Wood, Hollington.

Barclays Bank, North Street, Brighton (1957–59, as Denman & Son)

Denman and son used the Classical style for this new bank branch in the centre of Brighton. The style was rarely used so late in the 20th century, and the Portland stone building has been called a "sombre monolith". The windows are tiered in three stages; on the top storey, a loggia in the Italianate style runs in front.

St Luke's Church, Chyngton, Seaford (1958–59; attr.)

This hall-style church with brick and flint walls with domestic-style windows and a rounded projection at one corner has been attributed to Denman on stylistic grounds, but no records exist to confirm this.

Johnson Brothers store, Western Road, Brighton (1966, as Denman & Son)

Built on Brighton's main shopping street, Western Road, this was originally a furniture shop but is now a large branch of clothing retailer Topshop. It is a plain building with a white-tiled façade above the ground-floor shopfront. Very small windows are arranged on a regular grid pattern.

=== Rebuilds and extensions ===
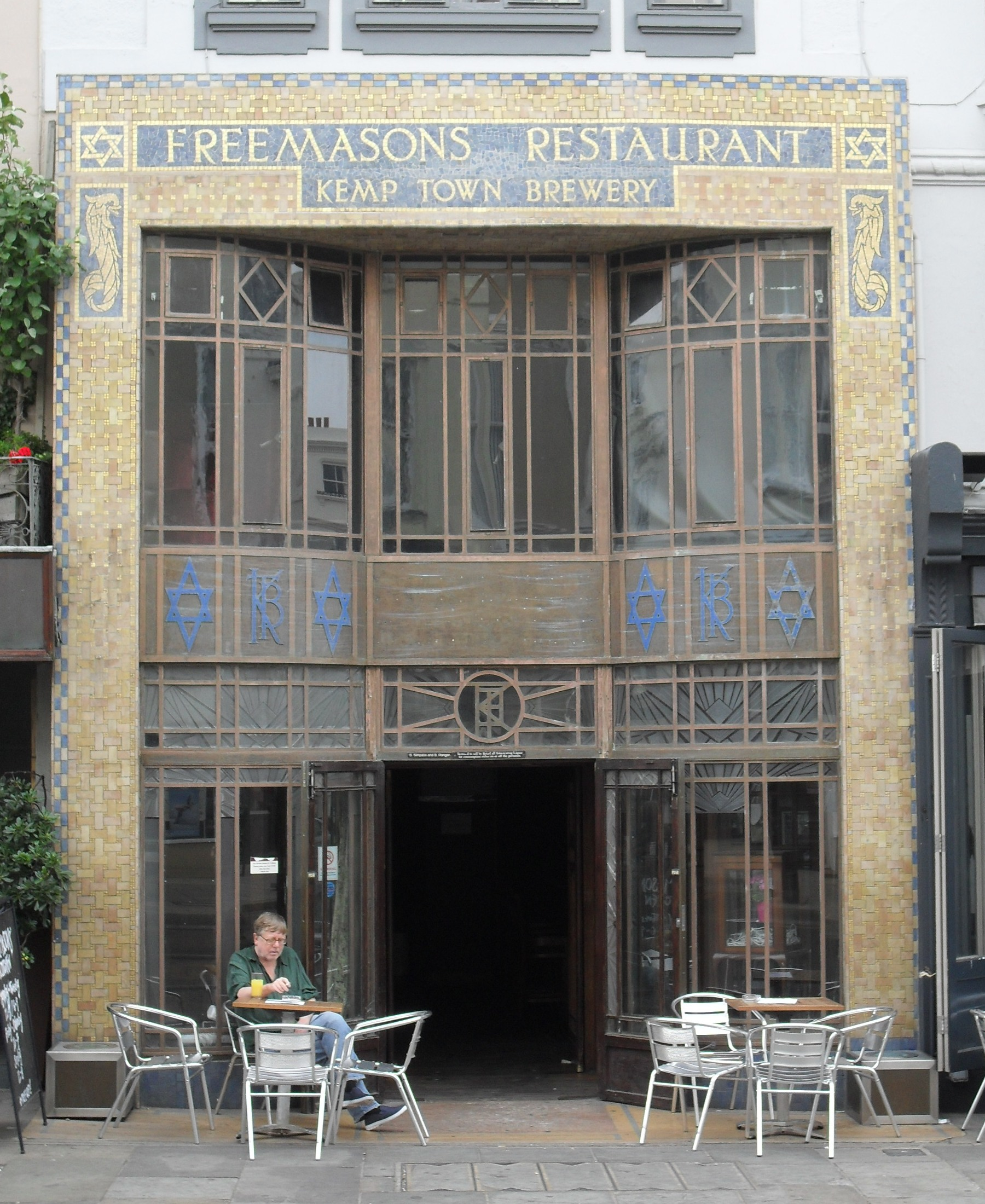
Façade of Freemasons Tavern, Hove (1928)

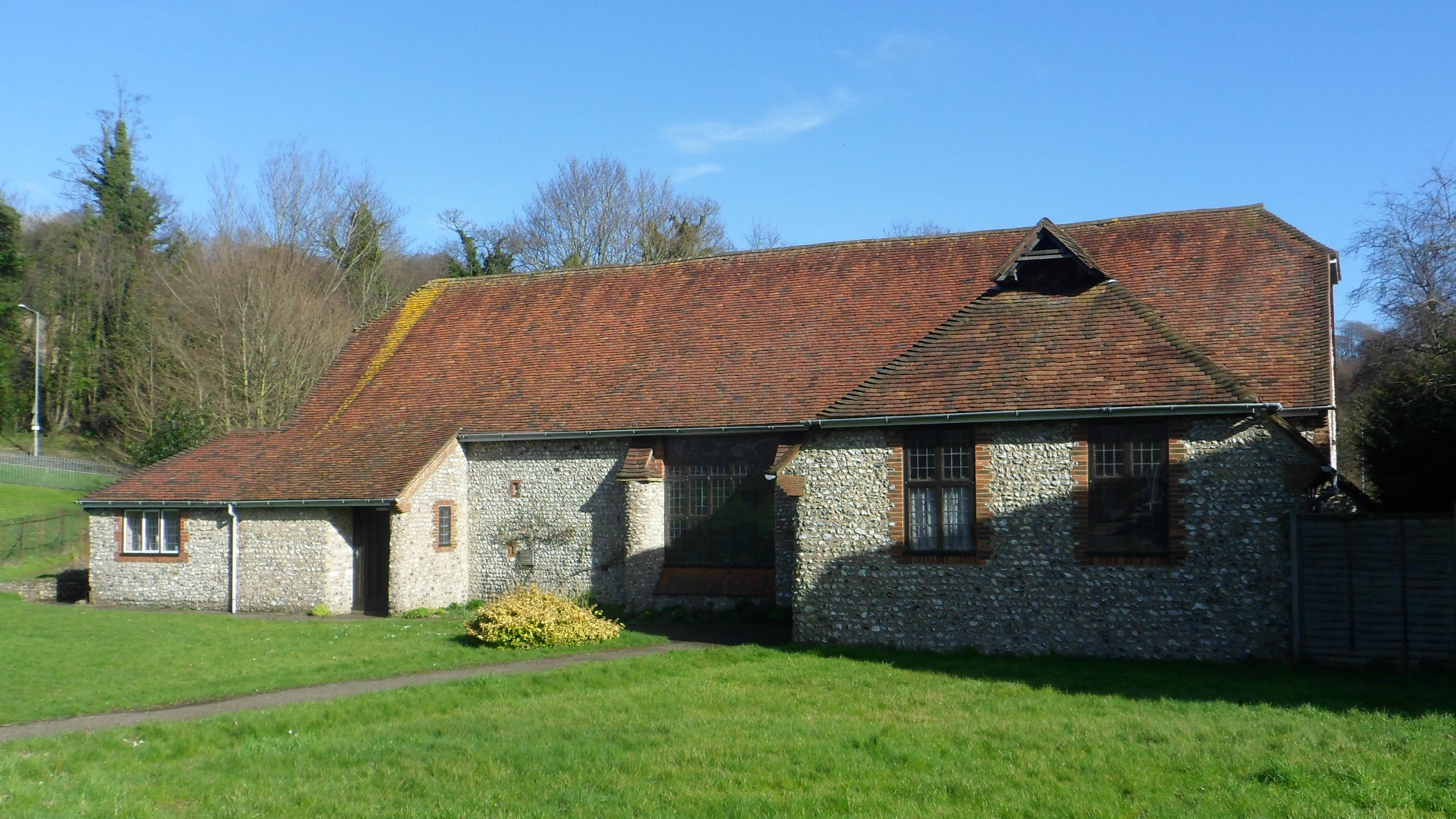
St Mary Magdalene's Church, Coldean (1955)

The Hanover pub, Queen's Park Road, Queen's Park, Brighton (1927)

Denman rebuilt and redesigned this pub on behalf of the Kemp Town Brewery. As of 2015 "it retain[ed] a number of external features from that date".

Sussex Masonic Club, Queen's Road, Brighton (1928; Grade II-listed)

Denman attached a Masonic Temple and its associated offices to the side of an 1830s Classical-style house attributed to Amon Wilds and Charles Busby. His "imposing if ungainly building" combines the Art Deco and Neo-Georgian styles. He built on to one side and the rear, increased the height by one storey and redesigned the interior with ornate Masonic decoration and panelling.

Freemasons Tavern, Western Road, Hove (1928; Grade II-listed)

Denman's "famous facelift" of this mid 19th-century corner-site restaurant, a plain stuccoed Classical-style building, has been described as "spectacular", "striking" and "reminiscent of the Viennese Secession". The three-bay exterior is framed by a two-storey gold and blue mosaic with gold lettering at the top. There is a dado with gold Masonic symbols, and there are Stars of David and chimera-like figures. Below the mosaic frame, a two-storey glazed bronze screen with metal framing leads to a recessed doorway. The inside is Art Deco in style.

The Railway Inn (now The Dolphin), South Street, Eastbourne (c. 1929)

This was another pub owned by the Kemp Town Brewery and reordered at their request in the late 1920s. Denman inserted mock-Tudor doorways with carved timberwork, leaded lights and herringbone brickwork.

The Egremont pub, Brighton Road, Worthing (c. 1929)

The Kemp Town Brewery bought this long established pub and attached brewery in 1924. Both had been built by brewer George Greenfield in 1835–36. The brewery went through several changes of owner and name up to 1924, although the pub's name (presumed to commemorate the Earl of Egremont, whose coat of arms appears on the exterior) remained the same. "It is virtually certain" that Denman carried out the refurbishment, which was undertaken soon after his work at the Railway Inn in Eastbourne and which shares many design features with that pub. Another refurbishment in 2015 preserved or reinstated many 1920s features.

The Abbey Convent, Storrington (1930; Grade II-listed)

Nikolaus Pevsner called this convent "an agglomeration of buildings of the last 100 years which is as picturesque as many Tudor houses". George Faithfull built the first part in the 1870s as a rectory. Colonel H.V. Ravenscroft commissioned Denman to add guest rooms, a ballroom and other rooms. There are elaborately carved fireplaces, moulded plastered ceilings and stained glass. The walls are of brown brick and sandstone, and the roof is tiled. Some gables have inset timber framing.

Brighton Hove & Sussex Sixth Form College, Dyke Road, Brighton (1934–35)

Denman altered and extended this building of 1913—a red-brick Neo-Georgian institution which was a grammar school at the time. Louis Ginnett designed a series of murals.

East End, East End Lane, Ditchling (1938–39)

Denman formed this house from two cottages, and added a flint staircase in the Arts and Crafts style at the front.

St Michael and All Angels Church, Southwick (1949–1950; Grade II*-listed)

The church has 12th-century origins but was mostly rebuilt in 1835. The tower, the oldest part, was destroyed by a wartime bomb in 1941. Denman "admirably rebuilt" it piece by piece in 1949, and extended the building at the same time by adding flanking vestries.

Hannington's store, North Street, Brighton (1950s; Grade II-listed)

Denman's work at this long-established department store, now closed, included an extension to the rear featuring a series of round-headed windows and a hexagonal turreted tower.

St Mary Magdalene's Church, Coldean (1955)

The Coldean housing estate developed from the 1930s, although it did not become part of the Borough of Brighton until 1952. A Vernacular-style 18th-century barn was chosen to house an Anglican church for the area. Denman "sensitively converted" the structure for its new use in 1955.

St Peter's Church, West Blatchington (1960–62; Grade II*-listed)

This ancient church was rebuilt in the 19th century and greatly extended by Denman when West Blatchington—originally a sparsely populated Downland farming area—became a residential suburb. His cobbled flint and brick nave and chancel combine well with the older parts, most of which have been retained. The clerestory illuminates both the old and the new sections.

Old Ship Hotel, Ship Street, Brighton (1963–64, as Denman & Son; Grade II*-listed)

Executed mostly by John Bluet Denman under the Denman & Son name, this "well-mannered extension" to Brighton's oldest inn (a building with 16th-century origins) consists of a tall entrance block on the corner, arranged to maximise the sea views (only one side faces the coast directly).

Bank House, High Street, Ditchling (undated)

Denman restored this house, which was built in 1576.

=== Church restorations ===
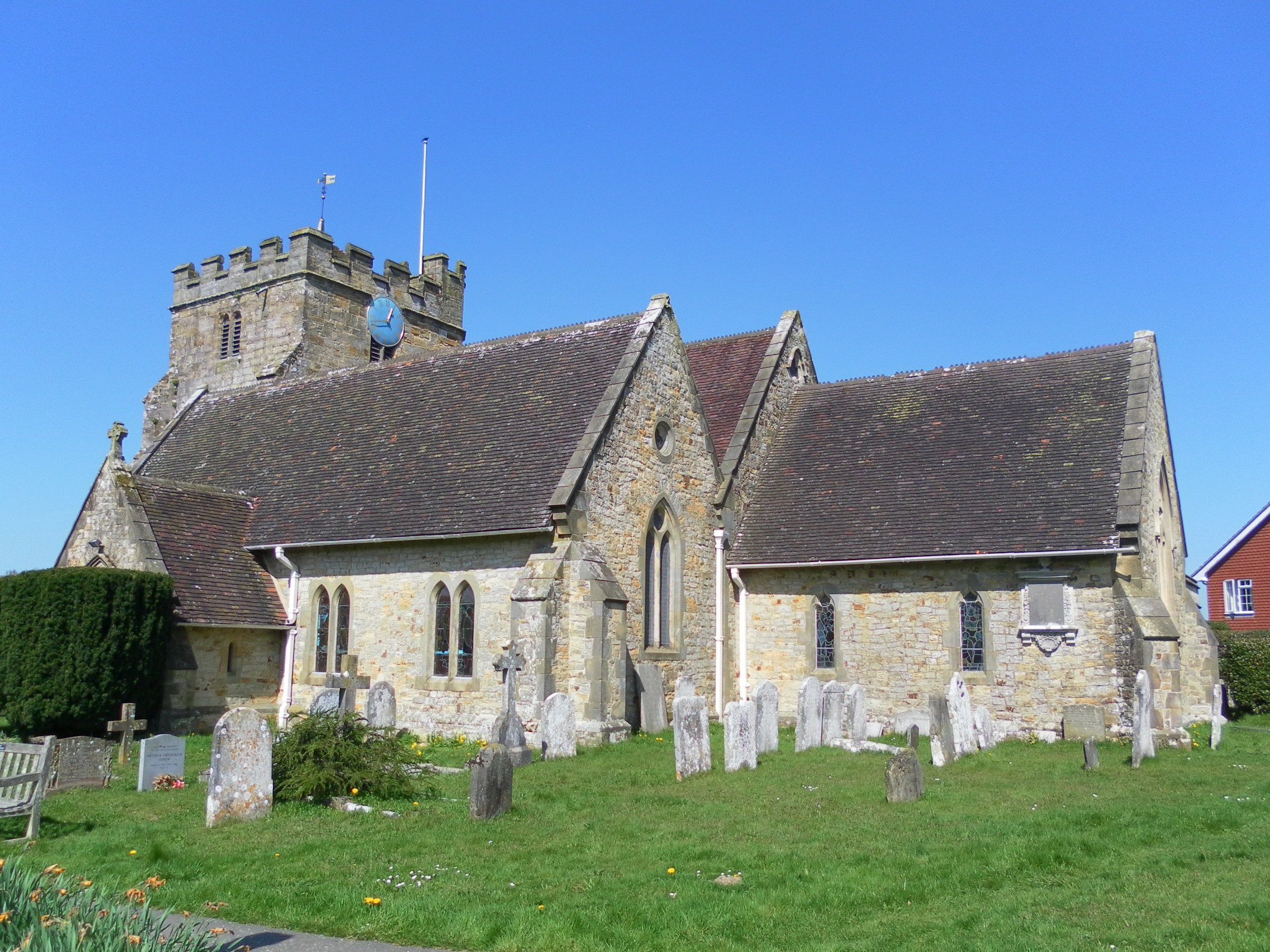
East Hoathly Church

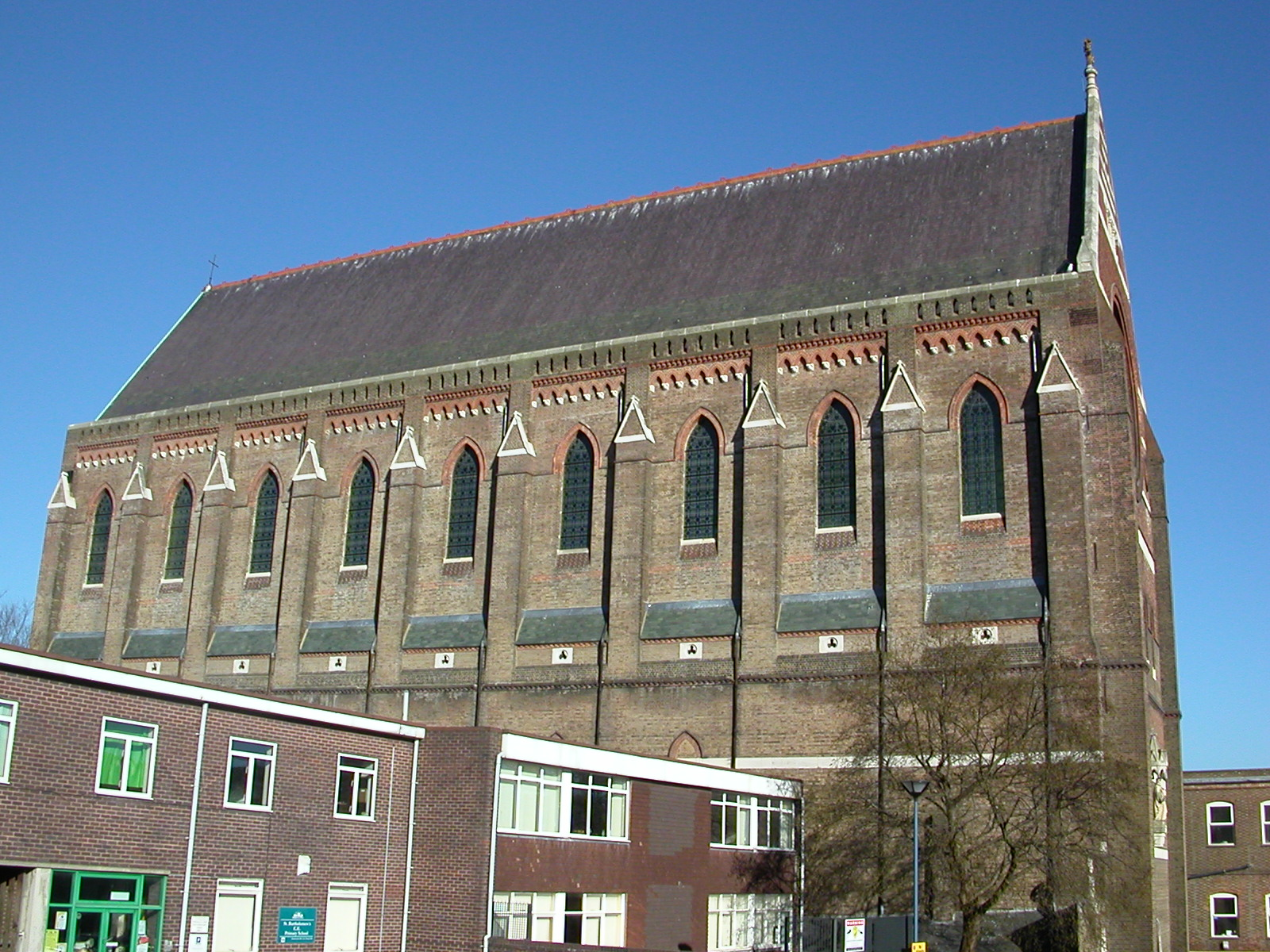
St Bartholomew's Church, Brighton

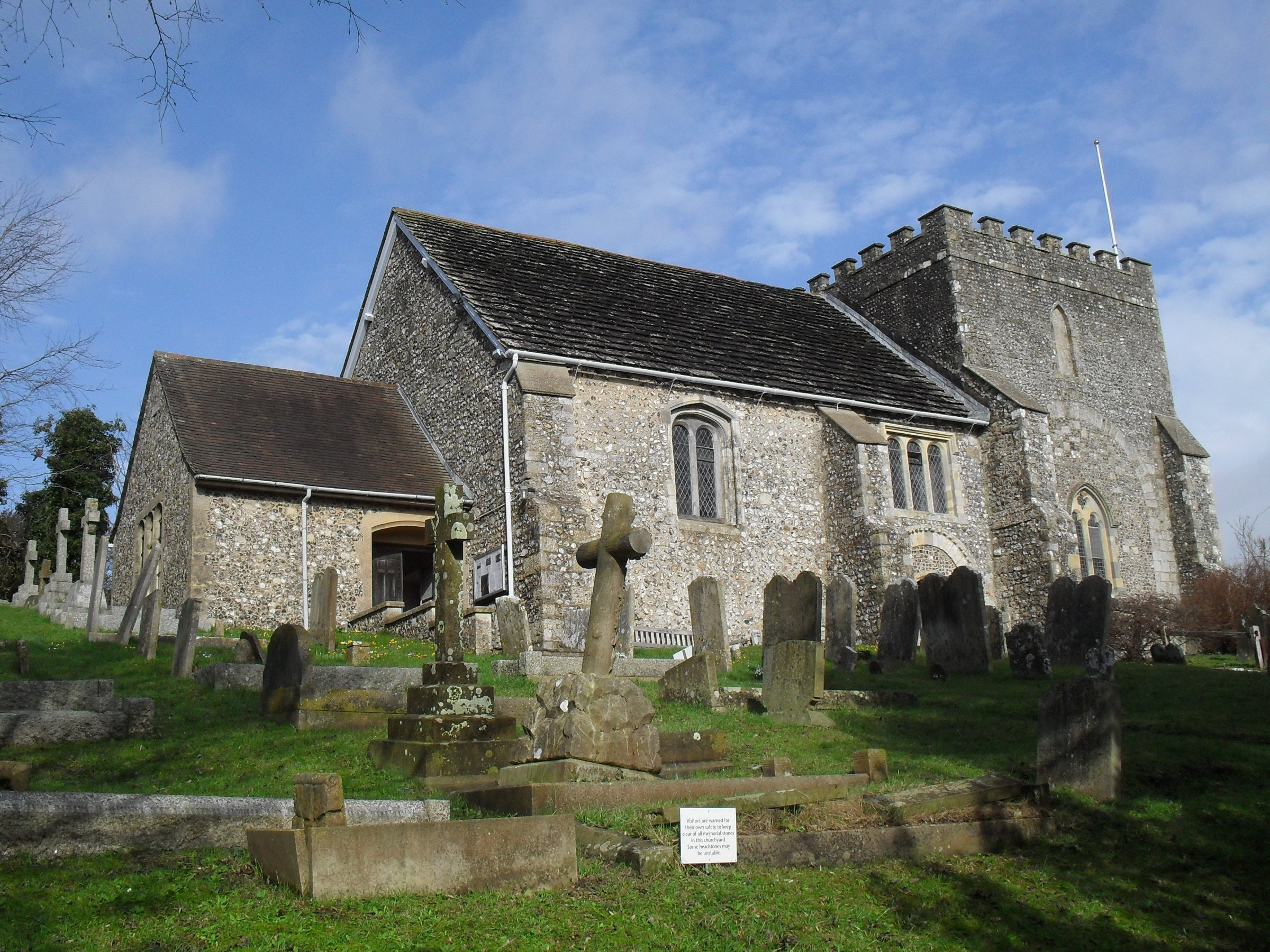
St Nicholas' Church, Bramber

John Leopold Denman undertook general restoration and repair work at many Sussex churches in the postwar period, often under the Denman & Son name with his son and other members of the practice. His treatment of medieval churches has been called "remarkably sensitive", in contrast to his less assured handling of Victorian-era buildings. His work at St Nicholas' Church in Brighton, where he designed a reredos in 1909, is his earliest recorded commission. He is believed to have restored many other churches apart from those for which records survive:

- Church of the Holy Sepulchre, Warminghurst (1959–60)
- East Hoathly Church, East Hoathly (1963–64)
- Holy Trinity Church, Bosham (1946–51)
- Holy Trinity Church, Eridge (1948–55)
- St Agnes' Church, Hove (1963–65)
- St Alban's Church, Frant (c. 1954)
- St Andrew's Church, Edburton (1958–59, 1961–63)
- St Bartholomew's Church, Brighton (1965)
- St George's Church, Kemptown, Brighton (1967)
- St Giles' Church, Horsted Keynes (1959–60)
- St John the Divine's Church, West Worthing (1971)
- St John the Evangelist's Church, Preston Village, Brighton (1965)
- St Leonard's Church, Aldrington (1954, 1970)
- St Margaret's Church, Rottingdean (1974)
- St Mark's Church, Hadlow Down (1965–67)
- St Mary's Church, East Grinstead (1959–61, 1964–66)
- St Mary de Haura Church, Shoreham-by-Sea (1967)
- St Mary the Virgin's Church, Glynde (1956–58)
- St Mary the Virgin's Church, North Stoke (1962–64)
- St Mary the Virgin's Church, Storrington (1960–70)
- St Michael's Church, Plumpton (1929, 1932)
- St Michael and All Angels Church, Withyham (1960–61)
- St Nicholas' Church, Bramber (1959–60)
- St Nicholas' Church, Brighton (1909)
- St Nicholas' Church, Poling (1968)
- St Paul's Church, Brighton
- St Peter's Church, Brighton (1966)
- St Peter's Church, Henfield (1959)
- St Peter's Church, Twineham (1959–62)
- St Philip's Church, Eastbourne (1965–69)
- St Simon and St Jude's Church, East Dean (1948–61)

Denman designed Buxted's war memorial, which stands in the grounds of St Margaret the Queen's Church in Buxted Park, in 1921. In about 1946, Denman designed the screens in the south chapel of St Margaret's Church in Ditchling as a memorial to Louis Ginnett. Joseph Cribb designed the carvings. In 1951 he designed the lychgate at St Michael's Church, Newhaven.

== See also ==
- Buildings and architecture of Brighton and Hove

== Bibliography ==
- Antram, Nicholas; Morrice, Richard (2008). Brighton and Hove. Pevsner Architectural Guides. London: Yale University Press. ISBN 978-0-300-12661-7.
- Antram, Nicholas; Pevsner, Nikolaus (2013). Sussex: East with Brighton and Hove. The Buildings of England. London: Yale University Press. ISBN 978-0-300-18473-0.
- Brighton Polytechnic. School of Architecture and Interior Design (1987). A Guide to the Buildings of Brighton. Macclesfield: McMillan Martin. ISBN 1-869865-03-0.
- Brodie, Antonia (2001). British Architectural Library (Royal Institute of British Architects) Directory of British Architects 1834–1914: A–K. Vol. 1. London: Continuum. ISBN 0-8264-5513-1.
- Collis, Rose; Carder, Tim (2010). The New Encyclopaedia of Brighton. (based on the original by Tim Carder) (1st ed.). Brighton: Brighton & Hove Libraries. ISBN 978-0-9564664-0-2.
- Dale, Antony (1989). Brighton Churches. London: Routledge. ISBN 0-415-00863-8.
- Elleray, D. Robert (1981). The Victorian Churches of Sussex. Chichester: Phillimore & Co. Ltd. ISBN 0-85033-378-4.
- Elleray, D. Robert (2004). Sussex Places of Worship. Worthing: Optimus Books. ISBN 0-9533132-7-1.
- Elleray, D. Robert (1998). A Millennium Encyclopaedia of Worthing History. Worthing: Optimus Books. ISBN 0-9533132-0-4.
- Middleton, Judy (2002). The Encyclopaedia of Hove & Portslade. Brighton: Brighton & Hove Libraries.
- Musgrave, Clifford (1981). Life in Brighton. Rochester: Rochester Press. ISBN 0-571-09285-3.
- Nairn, Ian; Pevsner, Nikolaus (1965). The Buildings of England: Sussex. Harmondsworth: Penguin Books. ISBN 0-14-071028-0.
- Seldon, Anthony; Nurse, Matthew; Twohig, Edward; Horlock, Christopher (2002). Brave New City: Brighton & Hove Past, Present and Future. Lewes: Pomegranate Press. ISBN 0-9542587-1-1.
- Skidmore, Chris (2021). Quakers and their Meeting Houses. Swindon: Liverpool University Press. ISBN 978-1-80085-720-9.
- Williamson, Elizabeth; Hudson, Tim; Musson, Jeremy; Nairn, Ian (2019). Sussex: West. The Buildings of England. New Haven and London: Yale University Press. ISBN 978-0-300-22521-1.
