= Charles Knight (artist) =

British landscape painter and stained-glass artist (1901–1990)

Charles Knight ROI VPRWS
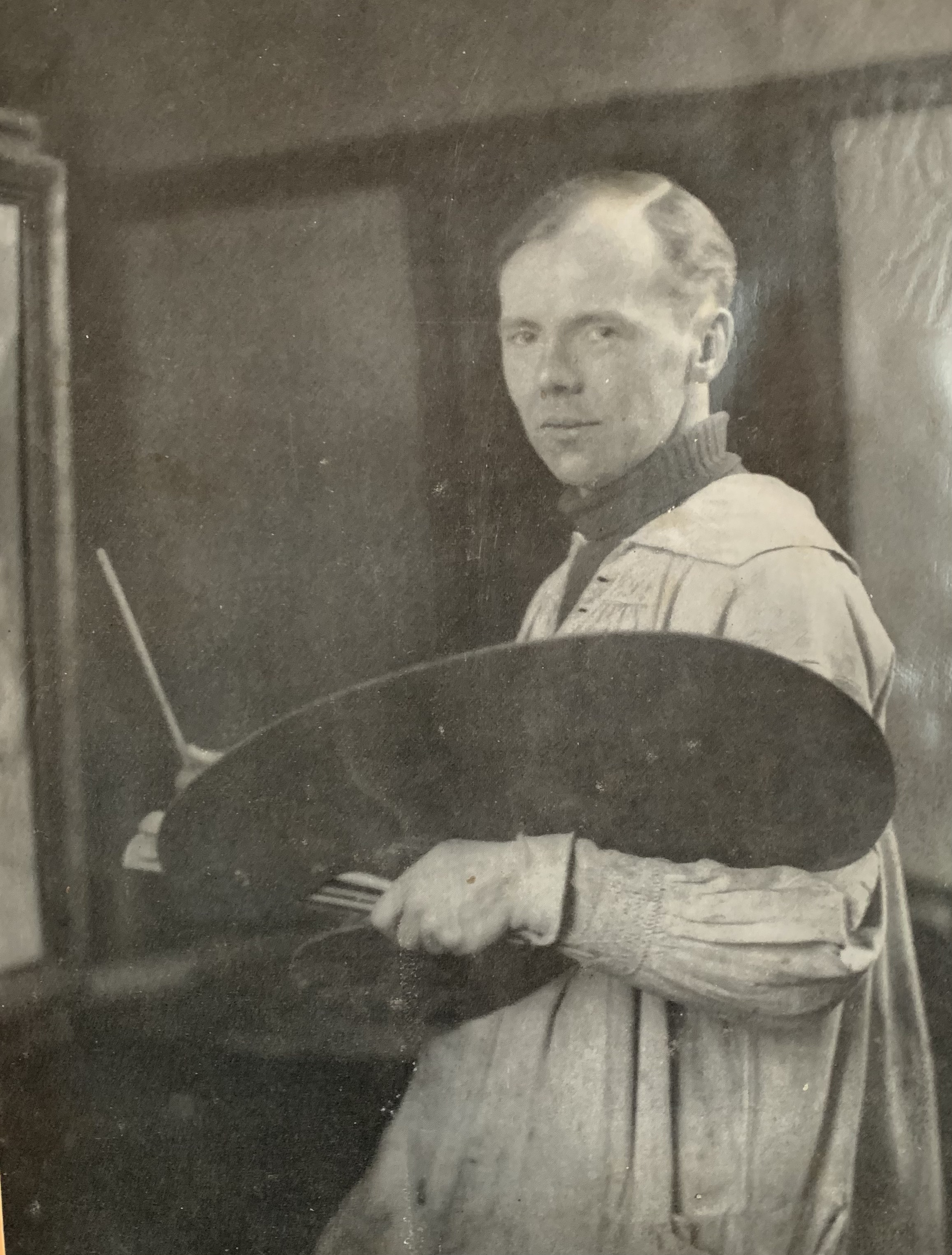
- Knight in his studio, c. 1930
- Born: 27 August 1901; Hove, Sussex, England
- Died: 15 May 1990 (aged 88); Ditchling, Sussex, England
- Resting place: St Margaret’s Church, Ditchling
- Education: Diploma in Art teaching
- Alma mater: Brighton College of Arts, Royal Academy of Arts
- Occupation: Landscape painter
- Years active: 1919–1990
- Spouse: Leonora Vasey
- Children: 1

Charles Knight ROI VPRWS (27 August 1901 – 15 May 1990) was a British landscape painter and stained-glass artist, best remembered for his watercolour paintings of the landscapes of Sussex. His works are in the permanent collections of the Victoria and Albert Museum, the British Museum, the Royal Watercolour Society, Towner Eastbourne and the University of Brighton.

== Early life ==
Knight was born on 27 August 1901 in Hove, Sussex, the son of Charles Knight, an accountant to a Brighton publishing company, and his wife, Evelyn (née Nash).

Knight was educated at Stanford Road Junior school and Varndean School. He attended St Bartholomew’s Church, and sang in its choir. The church's vicar, Reverend Gilbert Elliott, took him on four trips to Europe between 1922 and 1925: to La Bouille near Rouen, Rouen itself, Lucerne, and Bruges. From Rouen they were able to visit Paris where Knight spent considerable time at the Louvre.

Knight spent his childhood in central Brighton. His paternal family were farmers from Slinfold, Sussex, and his father was an amateur artist and naturalist, accompanying Knight on many sketching trips starting when Knight was four years old.

== Career ==
From 1919 to 1923, Knight studied at the Brighton College of Arts. While at the school, he was influenced by the works of Louis Ginnett and John Leopold Denman, both of whom taught him and were later to become colleagues. In 1923, he attained a diploma in art teaching from the college, and won a scholarship to the Royal Academy of Arts. There, he was inspired by Charles Sims, who taught him his technique of painting in oil over a tempera base, and by Walter Sickert, George Clausen and Glyn Philpot, all of whom taught him. He was particularly influenced by the technique of John Sell Cotman, which influenced several of Knight's early works. In 1922, he was made a member of the Brighton Arts Club along with his father; they put on an exhibition of their paintings in that year. Knight's first solo exhibition was staged two years later at Hove Library, where he exhibited 52 paintings.

In 1925, Knight won the Landseer Scholarship, and the Turner Gold Medal for his oil landscape titled Llangollen, a work considered reminiscent in subject and style to Cotman. It was displayed at the Royal Academy of Arts' Annual Exhibition in 1926 and was bought for the Tate Gallery by Sir Joseph Duveen, thus establishing Knight's reputation, with him being elected a member of the Society of Sussex Painters in 1929, a member of the Royal Institute of Oil Painters and an associate of the Royal Society of Painters in Watercolours in 1933. He gained full membership of the Royal Society of Painters in Watercolours in 1936, eventually becoming the society's vice president in 1961.

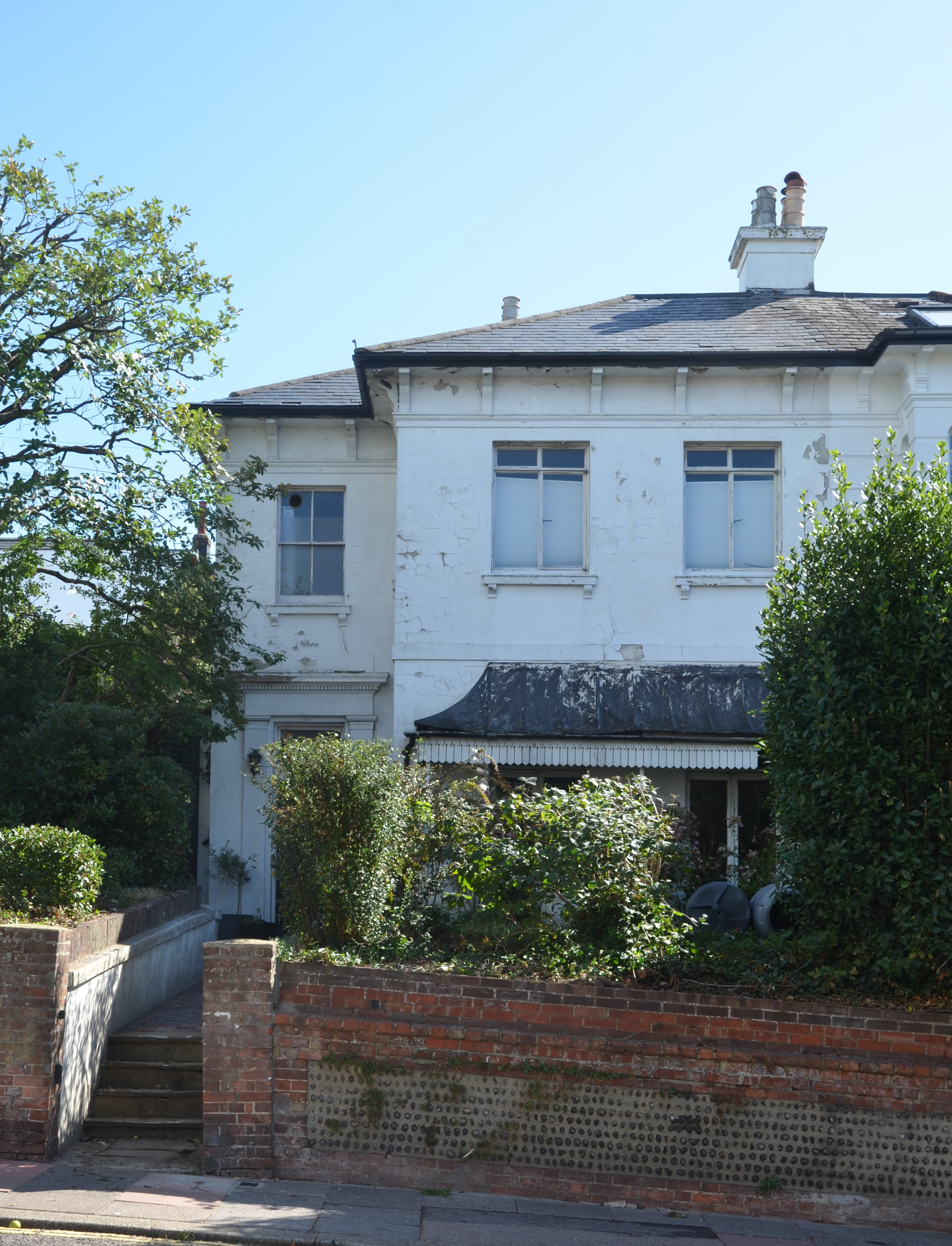
78 Ditchling Road, Brighton, East Sussex, childhood home of Charles Knight.

In 1926, he began lecturing at the Brighton College of Art, where he would go on to become the acting vice principal in 1959, and the vice principal in 1967, before retiring that same year. In the 1930s, he anonymously painted inn signs commissioned by the University of Birmingham Guild of Students for the Kemp Town Brewery's pubs 'The Grenadier' in Hove and the 'Friar's Oak' in Hassocks. Some of these signs were displayed at The Building Centre in 1936.

During the Second World War, Knight became a member of the Home Guard as well as a night telephone operator for the Civil Defence, his teaching post keeping him reserved from active service. In 1940, he was commissioned by the Pilgrim Trust for their Recording Britain scheme under Kenneth Clark. Knight contributed forty drawings of Sussex, in particular Brighton and Lewes, for which he was paid £5 each. Ten of his drawings made the final print, with his work being praised by William Russell Flint as the 'star turn' and by Kenneth Clark as the 'jewel in the crown'. His work was sometimes misunderstood by a wary public, though, and on one occasion he was mistaken for a German spy. In 1944, the Queen Mother invited Knight to teach Princess Margaret how to paint watercolours, holding classes at Windsor Castle and Buckingham Palace for three years from his appointment until the Royal Family's tour of South Africa brought them to an end.

After the war, Knight designed several stained-glass windows, including for the parish churches of Seaford (St Leonard), Burwash Weald (St Philip), Eridge Green (Holy Trinity), Hailsham (St Mary), Horsted Keynes (St Giles) and Keymer (St Cosmas and St Damian), as well as St John's Church in Hollington, Hastings, and the Church of the Good Shepherd and St Matthias Church in his native Brighton. In 1946, at St Patrick's Church, Hove, he painted the Stations of the Cross to designs by Louis Ginnett, who had recently died. Another of his local works was the carved representation of Minerva above the entrance to Brighton, Hove and Sussex Grammar School (now Brighton Hove & Sussex Sixth Form College), where he also designed some stained-glass windows. In 1947 he designed the east window above the altar in St Margaret's Church, Ditchling, where he had been worshipping since he moved to the village from Brighton (he was also an altar server and churchwarden at St Margaret's). In the 1950s, his drawings were used in a protest against the construction of a bypass in Ditchling. He also painted railway carriage panels of Knutsford, Crafnant Valley, and Ormskirk, amongst others. He etched at his own printing press in his studio, and was commissioned to work for architect John Leopold Denman, in particular by producing perspective drawings for many of Denman's proposed buildings.

Knight died on 15 May 1990. Several exhibitions of his work have been held in the Brighton and Hove area since his death, including some of his watercolours from the Recording Britain scheme (1995–96, at Brighton Museum & Art Gallery) and a major retrospective exhibition of Knight’s work entitled 'More than a Touch of Poetry' in conjunction with Chris Beetles Gallery London, held at the Towner Art Gallery, Eastbourne, the Hove Museum and Art Gallery and the Chris Beetles Gallery, London, in 1997.

== Personal life ==
Knight married illustrator Leonora Vasey, a fellow art student from Brighton School of Art, in 1934. They settled in Ditchling. Their son was born in 1938. Knight never learned to drive a car, preferring to walk with his painting materials in a backpack and be immersed in the landscape. He was active in Ditchling village life, being a church warden, a governor at the local school, and President of the Ditchling Preservation Society. He campaigned for the village green, where the Ditchling Museum of Art + Craft was established. Knight was not a member of the Guild of St Joseph and St Dominic community set up by Eric Gill, but he was, along with other artists including John Skelton and Frank Brangwyn, part of Ditchling's "arts and crafts ethos".
