= Patcham Pylons =

Patcham Pylon
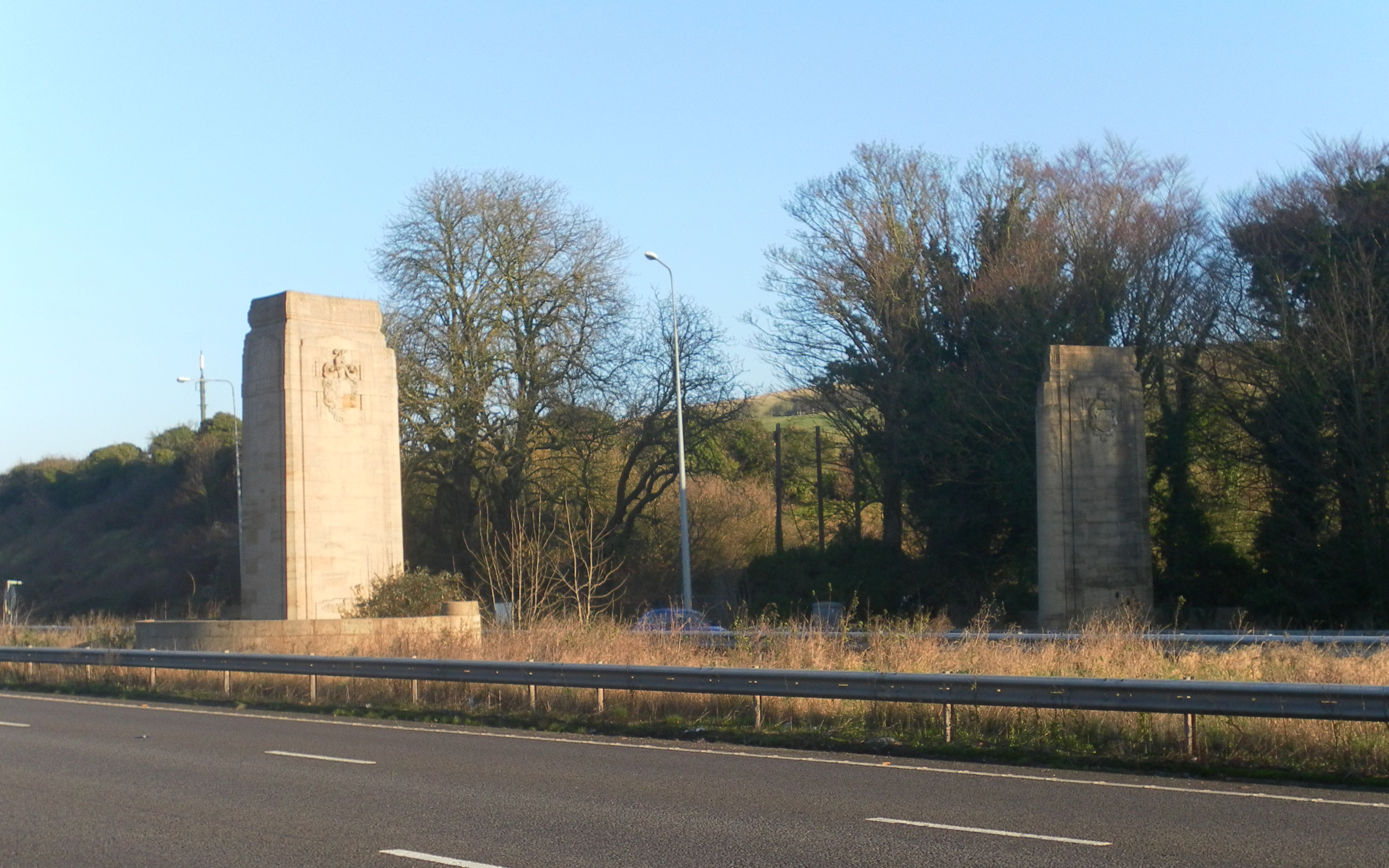
- The structures from the southwest

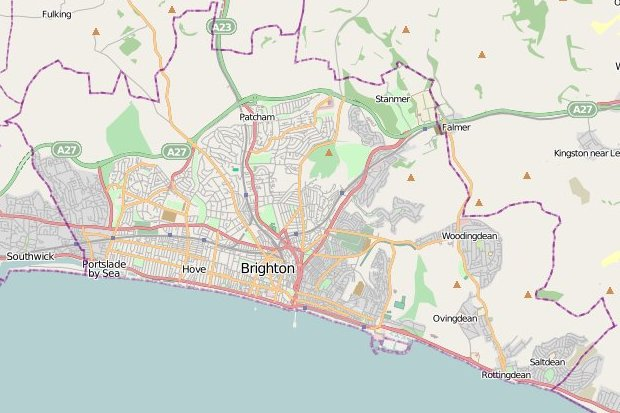
- Location within the city of Brighton and Hove
- 50.88059°N 0.16526°W
- Location: A23 (London Road), Patcham, Brighton and Hove, England

History
- Founded: 1928
- Built: 1928
- Built for: Sir Herbert Carden on behalf of the Borough of Brighton

Site notes
- Architect: John Leopold Denman
- Governing body: Brighton and Hove City Council

Listed Building – Grade II
- Official name: East Pylon; West Pylon; Seat next to East Pylon; Seat next to West Pylon
- Designated: 26 August 1999
- Reference no.: 1381679; 1381681; 1381680; 1381682

The Patcham Pylons are a monumental gateway erected in 1928 near Patcham in East Sussex, England. Designed by local architect John Leopold Denman and paid for by public subscription, they commemorated the extension of the County Borough of Brighton on 1 April 1928, and stood close to the new northern boundary.

The gateway consists of two stone towers known locally as "the Pylons", with built-in seats around their bases. They still stand and are clearly visible to travellers on either carriageway of the A23 road to London. They straddle the southbound carriageway of the A23 just inside the city of Brighton and Hove and are individually listed at Grade II along with the benches that were rebuilt in 1992.

== History and symbolic role ==
The pylons were built as a symbolic gateway to Brighton and was intended to extend a welcome to travellers approaching from the north along the A23. They were commissioned by Sir Herbert Carden, a local councillor, and were unveiled on 30 May 1928. He paid £2,255 towards them, and the public raised a further £993. They stand either side of what was, at the time of construction, a single carriageway road. Because the road is now a dual carriageway, one pylon now "stands forlornly in the central reservation, although a third was planned".

In the spirit of welcome, the north face of the western tower bears the inscription:

HAIL GUEST• WE ASK NOT WHAT THOU ART.
IF FRIEND. WE GREET THEE. HAND & HEART:
IF STRANGER. SUCH NO LONGER BE:
IF FOE. OUR LOVE SHALL CONQUER THEE.

This piece of text has been described by Paul Elmer More as being a Welsh door verse.

The pylons and seats were listed at Grade II by English Heritage on 26 August 1999. Such buildings are considered to be "of special interest warranting every effort to preserve them", and "nationally important" buildings of "special interest". As of February 2001, they were among 1,124 Grade II-listed buildings and structures, and 1,218 listed buildings of all grades, in the city of Brighton and Hove.

== Architecture ==
The pylons are of limestone with slightly concave north and south faces. Small buttresses protrude at the corners. Carvings and inscriptions include the coat of arms of the Duke and Duchess of York, who laid the foundation stone, the emblems of Brighton and Sussex, a female figure and a galleon. Details of the date, architect, builders, founders and other descriptive information, and a short poem, are also carved on the flat panels which are mounted on the concave faces. Next to each pylon is a seat, also made of stone and wrapping around but not touching the base. They are about 3 1/2 feet (1.1 m) off the ground, supported on small columns, and have decorative moulding. They are separately listed as Grade II.

== See also ==
- List of public art in Brighton and Hove

== Bibliography ==
- Antram, Nicholas; Morrice, Richard (2008). Brighton and Hove. Pevsner Architectural Guides. London: Yale University Press. ISBN 978-0-300-12661-7.
- Seldon, Anthony (2002). Brave New City: Brighton & Hove Past, Present and Future. Lewes: Pomegranate Press. ISBN 0-9542587-1-1.
