= Freemasons Tavern, Hove =

Freemasons Tavern
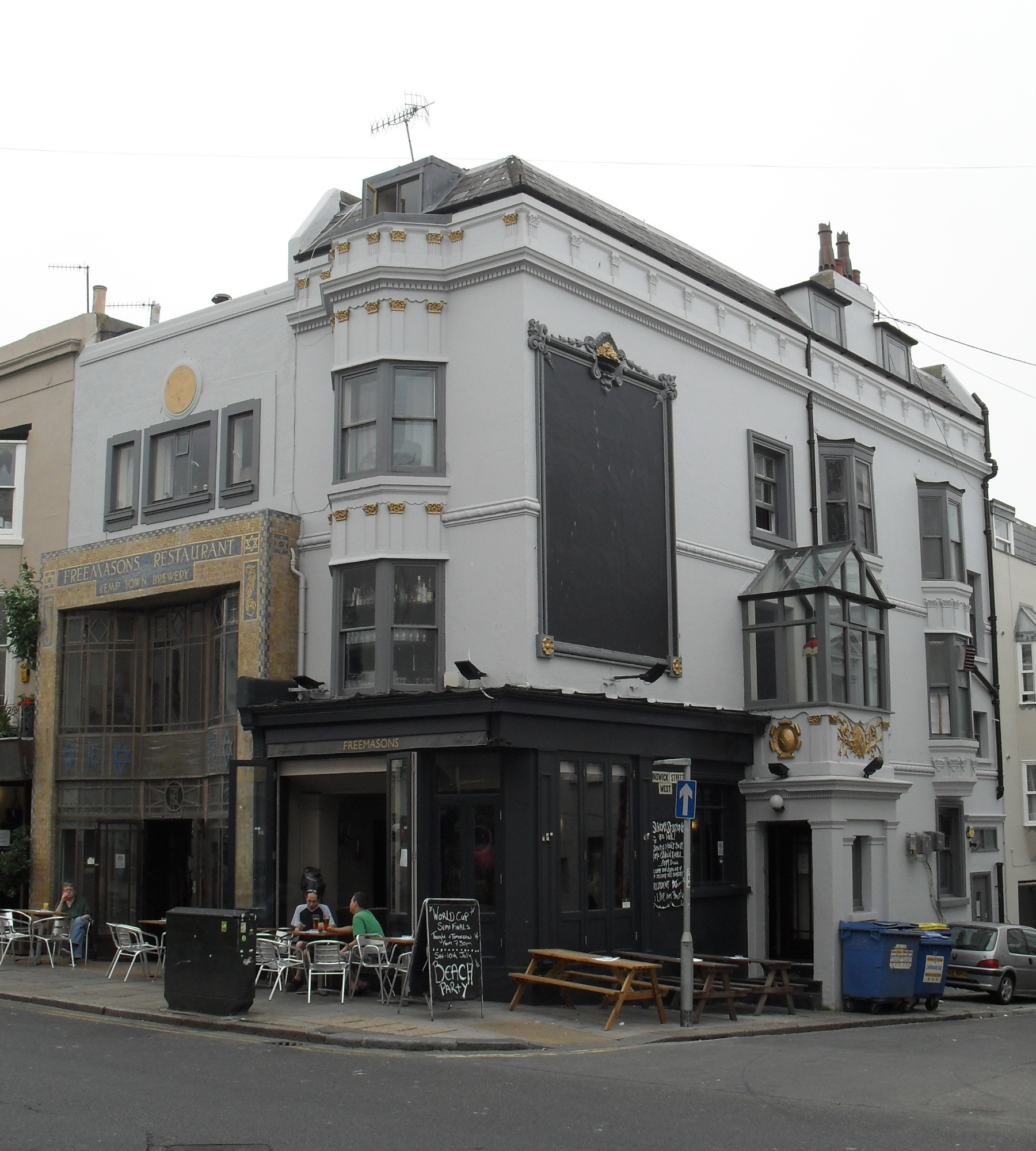
- The inn from the northwest

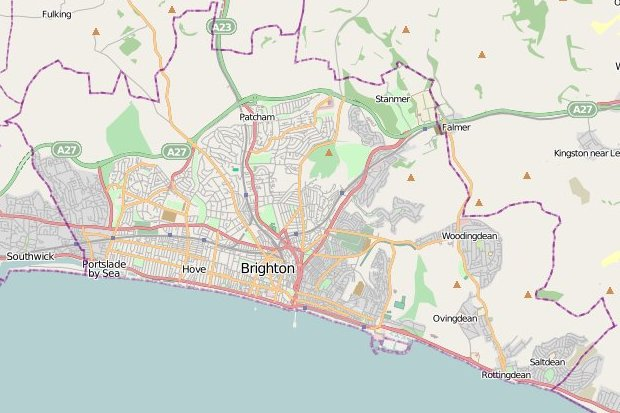
- Location within Brighton and Hove
- 50.8257°N 0.1597°W
- Location: 39 Western Road, Brunswick Town, Hove, Brighton and Hove, East Sussex, United Kingdom BN3 1AF

History
- Built: Early 1850s

Site notes
- Architect: J.L. Denman & Son (restaurant section)
- Architectural styles: Classical; Art Deco
- Restored: 1928 (restaurant section)

Listed Building – Grade II
- Official name: The Freemasons Inn and Restaurant
- Designated: 2 November 1992
- Reference no.: 1292378

The Freemasons Tavern (also known as the Freemasons Inn and the Freemasons Inn and Restaurant) is a 19th-century pub in the Brunswick Town area of Hove, part of the English city of Brighton and Hove. Built in the 1850s in a Classical style similar to the surrounding buildings in the rapidly growing Brunswick Town area, it was given a "spectacular" renovation when a restaurant was added in the 1920s. Local architecture firm Denman & Son designed an ornate Art Deco interior and an elaborate, brightly coloured entrance adorned with Masonic symbols; both the exterior and the interior survive in excellent condition. The tavern is a Grade II Listed building.

== History ==
The early 19th-century development of the Brunswick Town estate—a self-contained community between Hove and neighbouring Brighton, with high-class housing forming an architectural set-piece around extensive seafront lawns, and lower-class houses in surrounding streets—was prompted by the rapid growth of Brighton over the preceding half-century and the willingness of architects, builders and speculators to design impressive lodging houses to attract fashionable upper-class visitors. The estate, designed and planned mostly by Charles Busby, lay within the parish of Hove but was generally considered to be part of Brighton, which at the time was much better regarded than the "mean and insignificant assemblage of huts" (as one contemporary writer described it) which made up Hove village. Work began in 1824 and continued for many years, but a second phase involving the construction of another three grand squares was unrealised.

Brunswick Square and Brunswick Terrace (Grade I-listed since 24 March 1950) formed the residential centrepiece; commerce and other support facilities, such as a town hall, jail, market and church (which was not originally part of the estate's plan), were confined to side streets. One such was Brunswick Street West, which ran north–south from the seafront to Western Road, the main east–west route into Brighton. As well as some working-class housing, the small, narrow street supported four pubs; such high densities of pubs were common in lower-class residential areas in the Victorian era. Three survive: the Star of Brunswick, the Bow Street Runner and the prominently sited Freemasons Tavern, on the corner of Western Road and Brunswick Street West and with entrances in each.

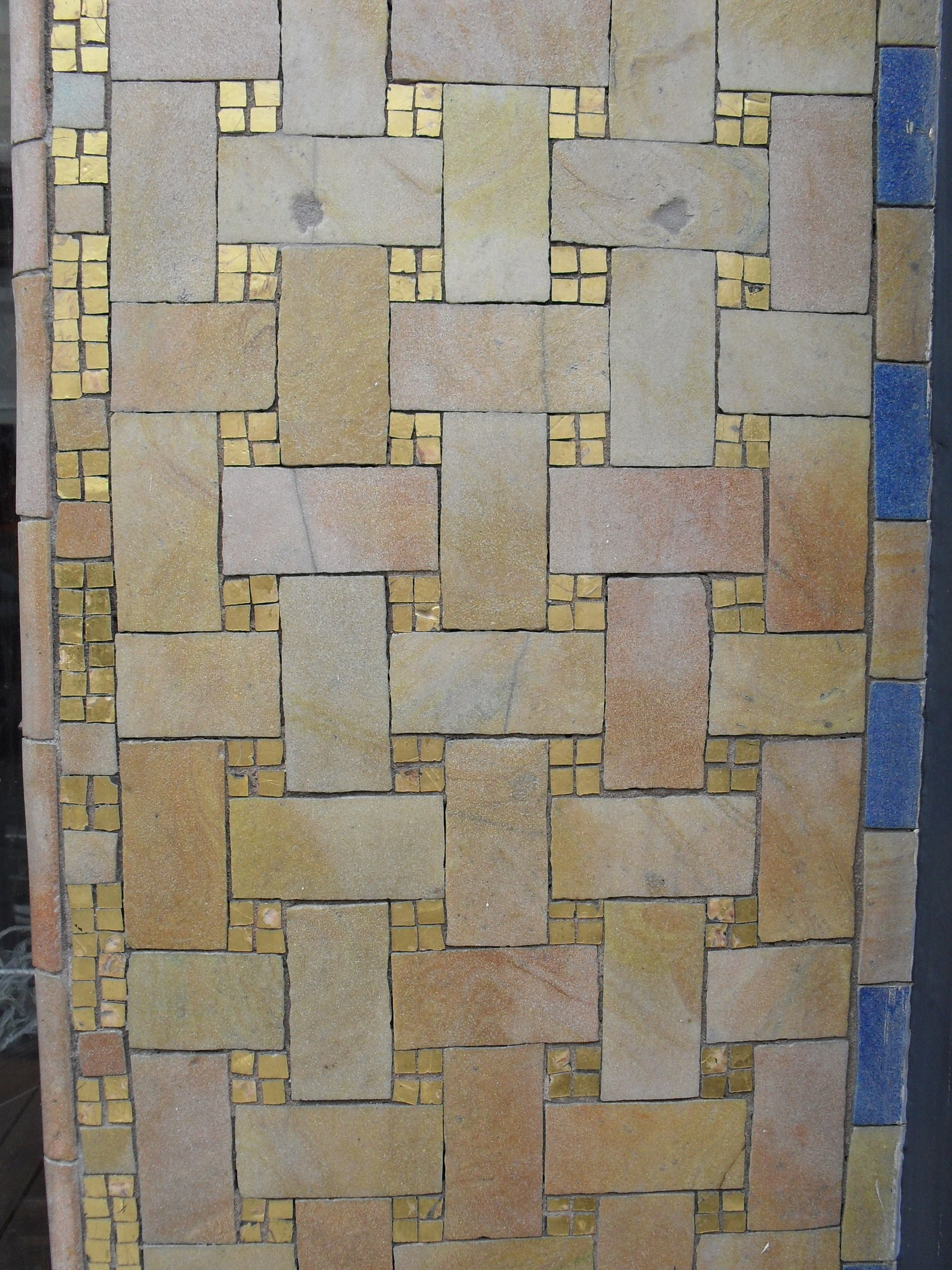
Detail of the mosaic on the restaurant façade

The inn existed by the 1850s, according to census information; its first landlord, Thomas Lindfield from Egham in Surrey, passed it on to his son John, who sold it in the mid-1870s. The next landlord was also long-serving, but ownership changed more frequently from the late 1890s onwards. The incumbent in 1928 was Frank Dickerson; at this time the recently incorporated Kemp Town Brewery of Kemp Town, Brighton, took ownership of the pub and decided to refit and extend it to include a restaurant. They commissioned John Leopold Denman of Denman & Son to carry out the work. The firm was used regularly by the Kemp Town Brewery for pubs along the Sussex coast, and also undertook much work on offices and other commercial developments. Denman's preferred style for these buildings was Neo-Georgian, although he and his son were capable of handling other styles effectively. Their design for the restaurant was highly elaborate inside and out, and was based on the Art Deco style popular at the time. The entrance was framed by a two-storey mosaic of blue and gold pieces adorned with Masonic symbols, the Star of David and bizarre griffin-like creatures. A partly glazed curved screen led inwards to an Art Deco interior with integral furniture.

Proposals to turn the former Brunswick Town Hall, on the opposite side of Brunswick Street West, into a sports-themed bar were overturned in the early 1980s. The landlord at the time argued that having a large bar so close would damage trade. In 2000, the pub's new owners planned to restore the building to its original condition; a designer who worked on the television programme Grand Designs was enlisted for the work, which cost about £150,000 and took place in 2001–02. The work included a "spectacular" lavatory installation, with a glass feature wall with a waterfall and a volcano image.

The Freemasons Tavern was designated a Grade II Listed building on 2 November 1992.

== Architecture ==
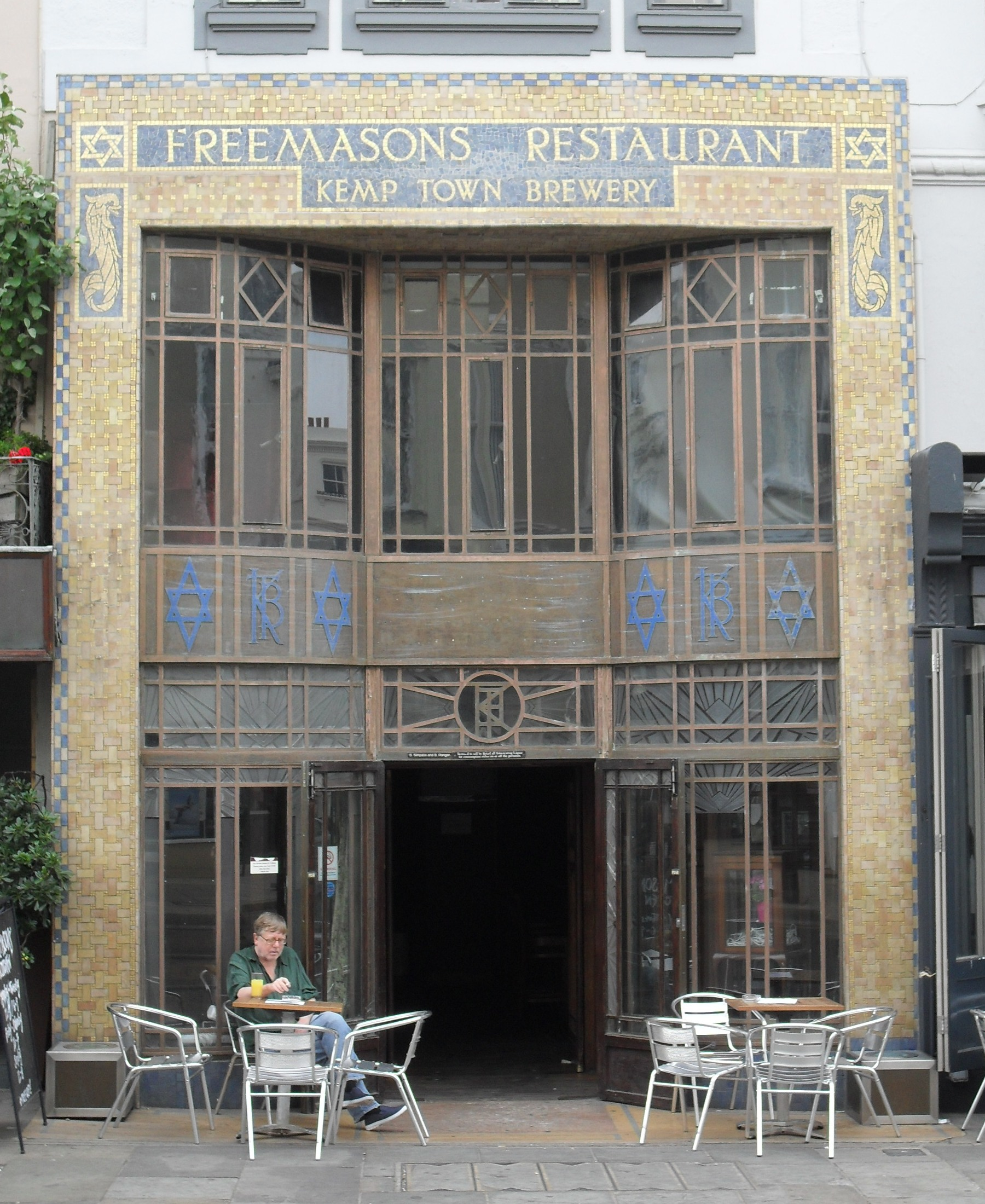
The restaurant façade

The Freemasons Tavern occupies a corner site, and is L-shaped and double-fronted with entrances in both the north (Western Road) and west (Brunswick Street West) faces. As originally built, it is a three-storey stuccoed building in the Classical style, with a slate-tiled mansard roof. Underneath the stucco, the walls are of brick. The restaurant part is on the east side, facing Western Road only; the pub section wraps around the corner, with a one-bay façade to Western Road and four bays facing Brunswick Street West.

The pub section has a canted bay window in the form of an oriel rising through the two upper storeys. Pilasters topped by gold-painted capitals sit above each window; on the top floor, they reach the parapet. Above this is a flat-headed dormer window leading to attic space. There are similar oriel windows on two of the four bays on the western face, as well as a large single-storey porch with a modern glazed extension at first-floor level.

The "striking" and "spectacular" restaurant section, added as part of the "famous facelift" of 1928, has been described as "reminiscent of the Viennese Secession". The three-bay exterior is framed by a two-storey gold and blue mosaic with gold lettering at the top, reading freemasons restaurant and kemp town brewery. The dado has gold Masonic symbols, and the lettering at the top is framed by two Stars of David; below these, there are a pair of gold figures in the form of chimera, with a griffin- or fish-style head and a curved body like that of a seahorse. Below the mosaic frame, a two-storey glazed bronze screen with metal framing leads to a recessed doorway. Some of the glass is leaded with sunburst forms. Paired bronze lamp-holders project from the entrance. At second-floor level, there is a modern three-part window. Inside, much of Denman & Son's Art Deco work survives. There are moulded beams and friezes with swag motifs, integral seating and other furniture, Art Deco lighting, decorative plasterwork and an original staircase.

== See also ==
- Grade II listed buildings in Brighton and Hove: E–H

== Bibliography ==
- Antram, Nicholas; Morrice, Richard (2008). Brighton and Hove. Pevsner Architectural Guides. London: Yale University Press. ISBN 978-0-300-12661-7.
- Brighton Polytechnic. School of Architecture and Interior Design (1987). A Guide to the Buildings of Brighton. Macclesfield: McMillan Martin. ISBN 1-869-86503-0.
- Middleton, Judy (2001). Brunswick Town. (monograph)
- Middleton, Judy (2002). The Encyclopaedia of Hove & Portslade. Brighton: Brighton & Hove Libraries.
