= John Denman (cricketer) =

English cricketer (born 1947)

John Denman (born 13 June 1947 in Horley, Surrey) is an English former cricketer active from 1970 to 1973 who played for Sussex. He appeared in 49 first-class matches as a righthanded batsman who bowled right arm medium pace. He scored 713 runs with a highest score of 50 not out and took 70 wickets with a best performance of five for 45.

Denman later became a geography teacher and also coached cricket at top independent boarding school Worth Abbey, in Turners Hill, Sussex, through the 1980s and into the 1990s. During that time he was also associated with youth coaching for Sussex CCC at up to U18 level.
