= Linenfold =

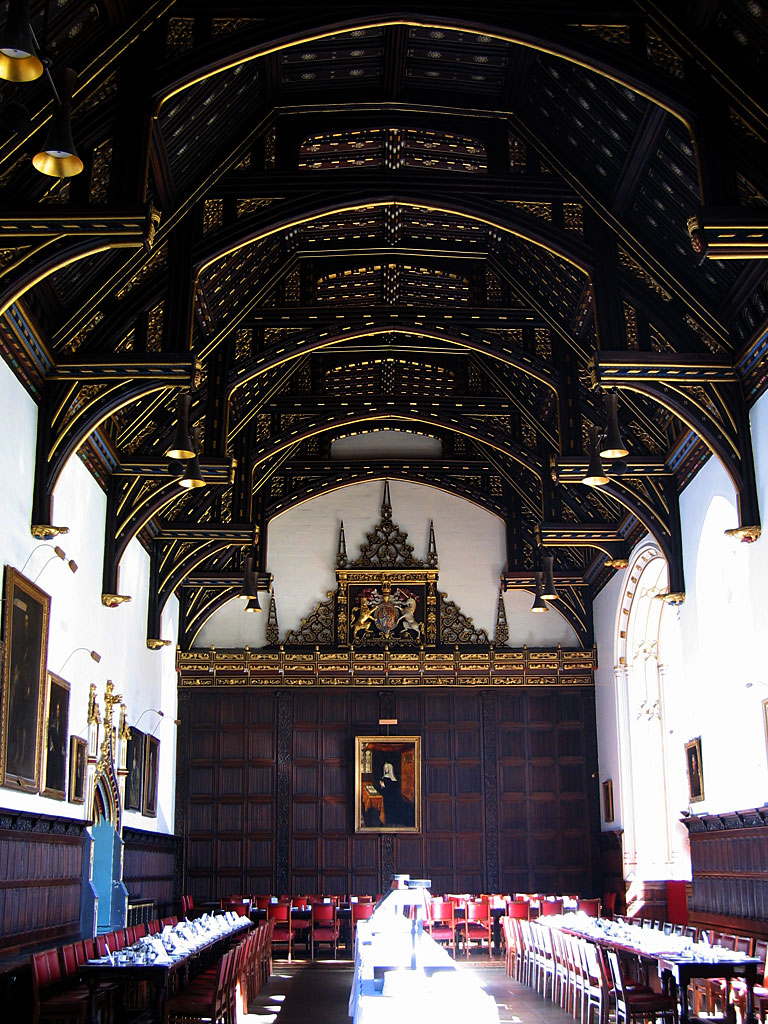
The lower parts of the walls of the 16th century dining hall of St John's College, Cambridge are covered with wood panelling in a linenfold design.

An English oak chest with complex linenfold panels.

Linenfold (or linen fold) is a simple style of relief carving used to decorate wood panelling with a design "imitating window tracery", "imitating folded linen" or "stiffly imitating folded material". Originally from Flanders, the style became widespread across Northern Europe in the 14th to 16th centuries. The name was applied to the decorative style by antiquarian connoisseurs in the early 19th century; the contemporary name was apparently lignum undulatum (Latin: "wavy wood"), Nathaniel Lloyd pointed out.

Wood panelling or wainscoting, almost always made from oak, became popular in Northern Europe from the 14th century, after European carpenters rediscovered the techniques to create frame and panel joinery. The framing technique was used from the 13th century onwards to clad interior walls, to form choir stalls, and to manufacture moveable and semi-moveable furniture, such as chests and presses, and even the back panels of joined chairs. Linenfold was developed as a simple technique to decorate the flat surfaces of the ubiquitous panels thus created.

The simplest linenfold style is "parchemin" (also known as "parchment fold"), a low relief carving formed like a sheet of paper or piece of linen folded in half and then spread out with the sharp centered fold running vertically, and the top and bottom running out to the corners of the panel, with something of the appearance of an opened book. This style of linenfold can be created using a plane and a pre-drawn pattern, with a little finishing chisel work required at each end. A stitched embroidered border could be counterfeited by the use of punches. More complicated styles resemble a sheet of fabric that has volute folds back and forth many times. Linenfold might be fielded, visually complete against a flat panel surface and contained within each panel, or it might provide the appearance of a continuous linenfold passing behind the stiles of the framing.

Carving linenfold decoration requires basic carving skill, the creased designs were run with a round plane; only top and bottom edges needed to be finished with a gouge. Significantly, linenfold had no prototype in architectural practice: the technique of the round scraper plane is also applicable to softer stone-cutting.

Regional variations quickly developed in England, France and Germany. The linenfold of France, Netherlands, and Germany "is carved with a sharper definition and greater delicacy than was usual in England", where early linenfold panelling can be seen in the hall screen at Compton Wynyates. Linenfold started to fall out of fashion as Renaissance styles spread in the 16th century, replaced by fielded panels for simpler work, and more complicated "Roman" and higher relief carving, but linenfold continued to be used in less sophisticated surroundings well into the 17th century. In the 19th century, linenfold panelling reappeared in the revivals of the Gothic and Tudor styles.
