= Louis Ginnett =

British portrait painter (1875–1946)

Louis Ginnett (24 July 1875, in Brighton – 1946, in Brighton) was a British portrait, mural and stained glass painter, who taught at the Brighton School of Art from 1909 to 1939. He was a war artist on the front during the First World War. A graduate of the Académie Julian in Paris, he was a member of the Royal Institute of Oil Painters and eventually served as President of the Royal Society of Portrait Painters. His works are in the permanent collections of the Brighton Museum & Art Gallery and the Imperial War Museum.
