= Public services in Brighton and Hove =

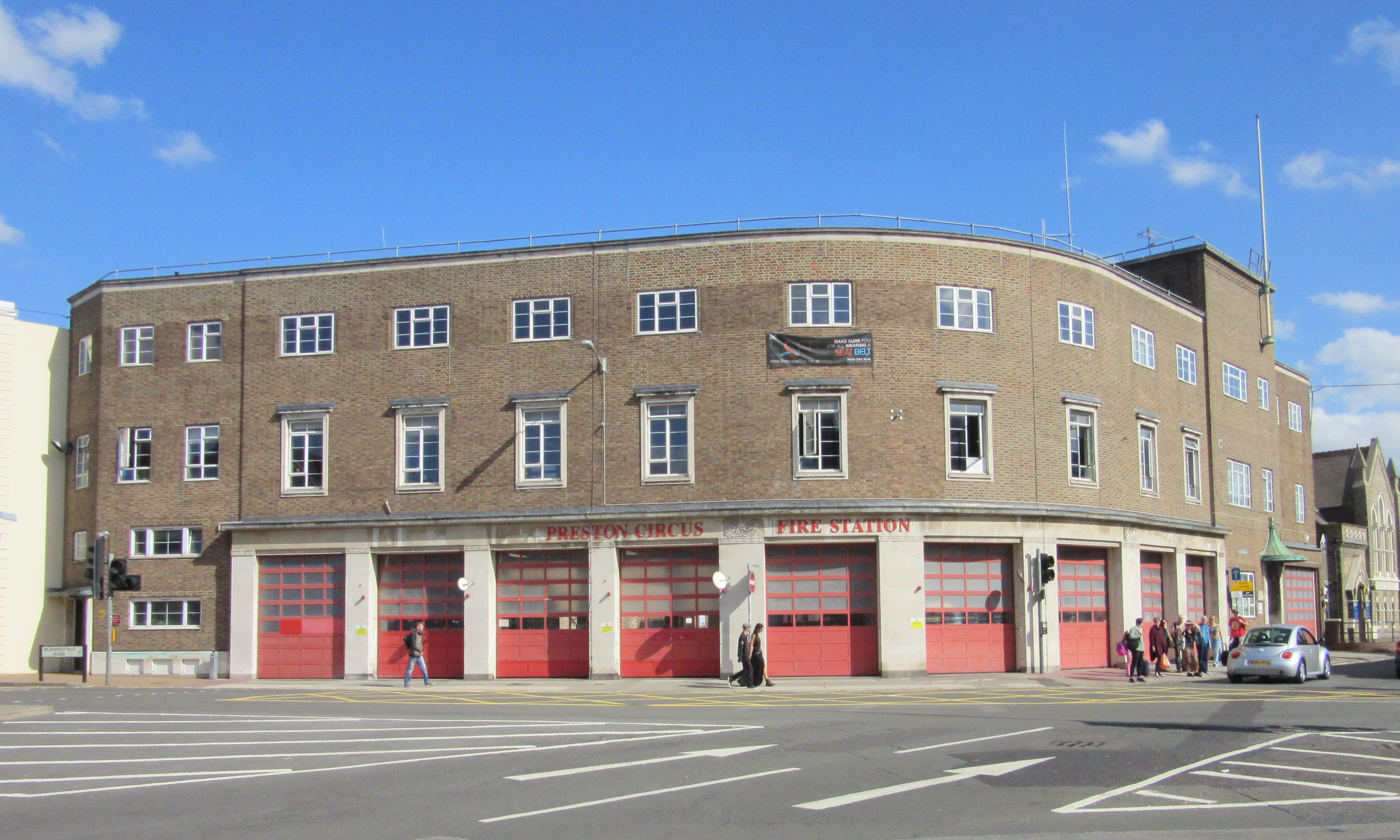
Preston Circus Fire Station, the main fire station in Brighton, was built in 1938.

Brighton and Hove, a city and unitary authority in the English county of East Sussex, has a wide range of public services funded by national government, East Sussex County Council, Brighton and Hove City Council and other public-sector bodies. Revenue to fund these services comes partly from Council Tax, which is paid annually by residents: this tax provides the city council with nearly 20% of its income and also helps to fund the local police force, Sussex Police, and the county's fire service, East Sussex Fire and Rescue Service. Some of Brighton and Hove's utilities and infrastructure are provided by outside parties, such as utility companies, rather than by the city council.

The city is made up of the previously separate towns and boroughs of Hove and Brighton, which had themselves absorbed other villages such as Aldrington, Portslade and Patcham at various times. Many of the city's public services have their origins in companies or entities formed in the 19th century, privately or by the councils of the formerly separate towns. For example, the first gas provider was formed in 1818 to provide a gas supply to the parish of Brighton; private electricity companies were set up in Brighton in the 1880s and Hove a decade later; numerous hospitals and healthcare facilities were established throughout the 19th century, starting with the Brighthelmston Dispensary in 1810; and police forces and fire brigades were formed in Brighton, Hove and Portslade. In many cases these were amalgamated into larger entities as the towns grew in the 19th and 20th centuries. Many public services buildings were rebuilt in the postwar era, including Brighton's central police station, the courthouses in Hove and Brighton and the local telephone exchanges.

== Police ==
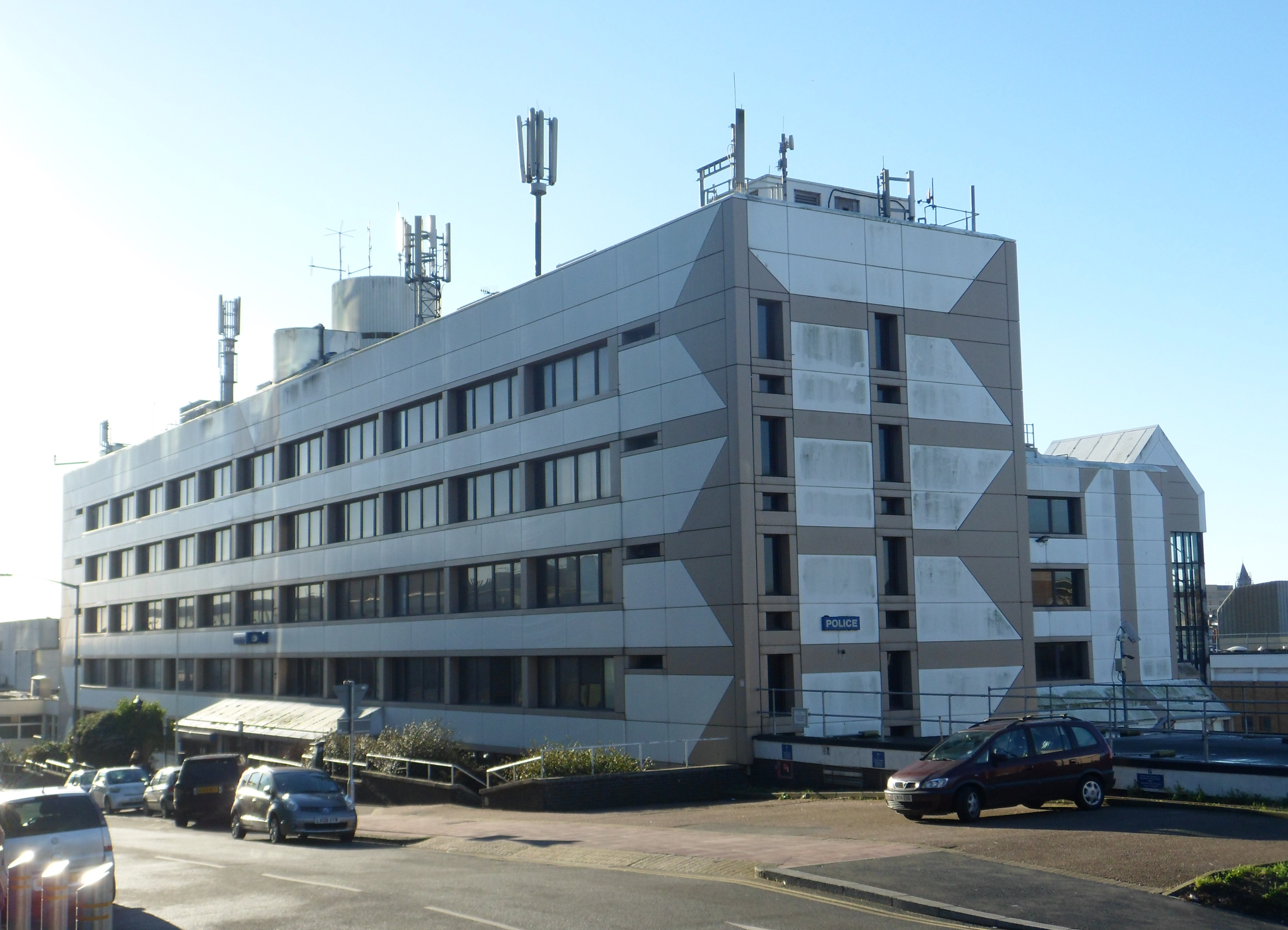
The central police station in Brighton was built in 1965.

The city of Brighton and Hove, along with the counties of East Sussex and West Sussex, is policed by Sussex Police, one of England's territorial police forces. The force has its headquarters in Lewes. Sussex Police is divided into three divisions, one of which covers Brighton and Hove; it is led by a chief superintendent.

For centuries Brighton had no formal local governance, and the administration of legal matters took place outside the town. Until 1773, the civic and legal affairs of Brighthelmstone (as it was then), and all activities which would now be covered by the police and courts, were administered by a small group of people self-selected from the "ancientest, gravest and wisest inhabitants". The "Society of Twelve" or "Fellowship of Twelve" consisted of eight fishermen and four landsmen (agricultural workers), reflecting the importance of those occupations. Each year these men would elect from their number one Head Constable and two Headboroughs to uphold law and order in the town. From the late 17th century these roles were elected by a jury of residents selected by the Marquess of Abergavenny in his role as Lord of the Manor of Whalesbone. Other municipal offices in Brighthelmstone's early history included the Beadle, a town crier described by local historian Antony Dale as "in cocked hat and full regalia"; overseers and collectors of the Poor rate; and two nightwatchmen who patrolled the town and who were nicknamed "Old Charlies" by residents.

A more formal system was put in place after the passing of the Brighthelmstone Improvement Act 1810 (50 Geo. 3. c. xxxviii). The newly appointed Brighton Commissioners, forerunners of the borough council (and therefore of the present city council), were given the power to appoint nightwatchmen. By 1815 there were 16, and by 1823 they were based at the original town hall under two superintendents. Full-time professional police officers were first appointed in 1838, replacing this system. The force consisted of Chief Constable Henry Solomon (murdered in 1844), two superintendents, three police inspectors and 24 ordinary officers. In 1854, when Brighton Borough Council was formed, the force (now numbering 61 men) came under its control. Numbers of officers increased steadily, and new roles were created: the first plain-clothes officer was appointed in 1854, along with a police surgeon, and female officers first joined the force in 1918. By 1967, the last year of the council's control prior to the formation of Sussex Police, there were 424 officers. In September 1933 radio handsets were issued to officers; the force was the first in the country to be equipped with a method of wireless communication.

The central police station was based at the new (1832) town hall until the present station was built on John Street in the Carlton Hill area of Brighton in 1965 to the design of Borough Architect Percy Billington. District police stations, which were abolished in 1928, existed at various times in Kemptown (St James's Street; later Freshfield Road), West Hill, Preston Circus, Patcham, Preston village, Rottingdean, Black Rock and at The Level. A short-lived secondary police station, originally a police training school, operated between 1949 and 1965 in the Elm Grove area. As well as the central police station on John Street, there is now also one on Crowhurst Road in the Hollingbury area. Brighton Borough Police became part of the new Sussex Constabulary (now Sussex Police) in 1968 when it combined with East Sussex Constabulary, West Sussex Constabulary, Eastbourne Borough Police and Hastings Borough Police.

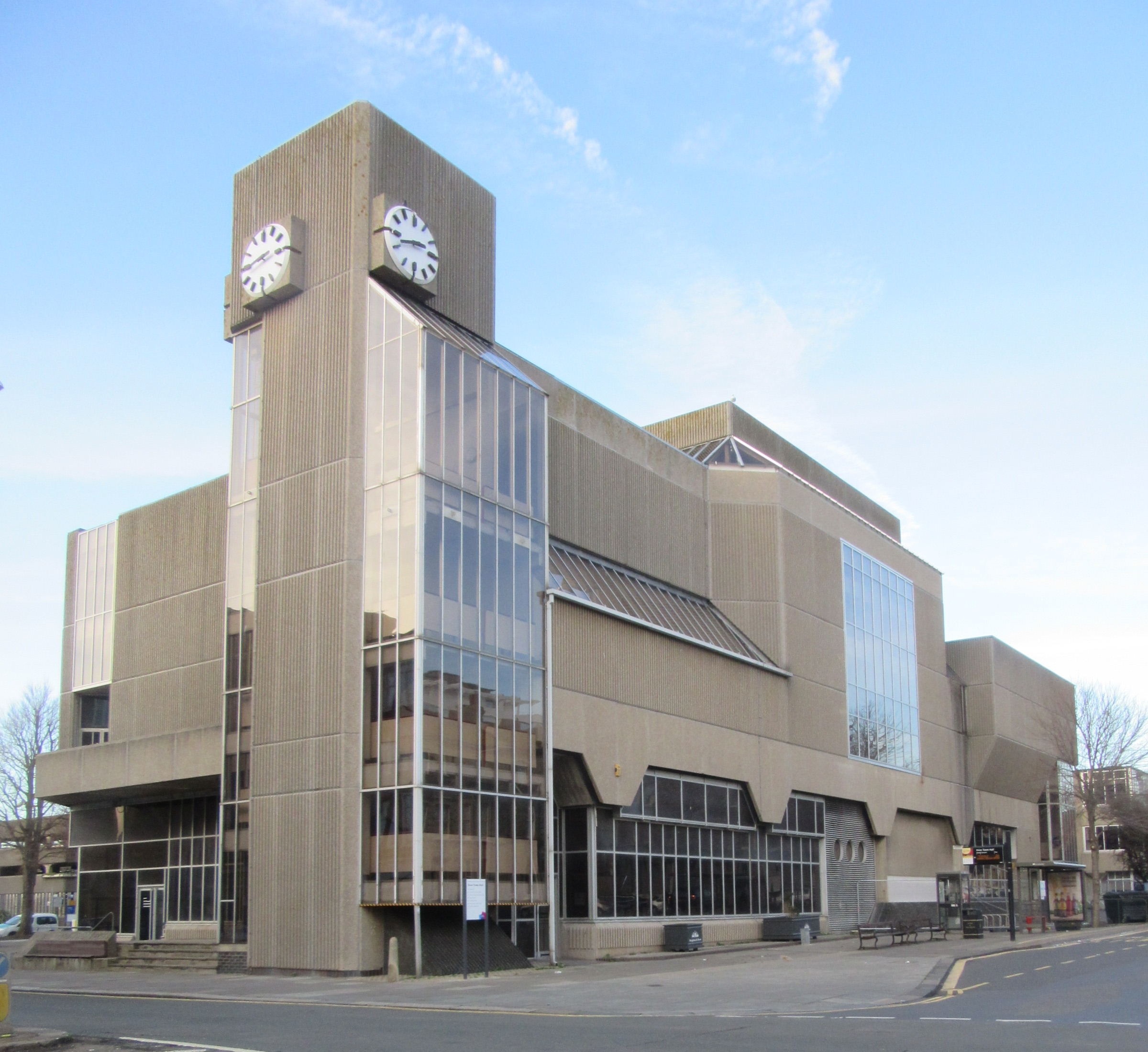
Sussex Police operate a "contact point" in Hove Town Hall.

The first police in Hove were the Brunswick Square Police Force, established in 1830 by the Brunswick Town Commissioners. The first station was on Brunswick Street West; it later moved to the original Hove town hall on Church Road. Hove Police Commissioners were formed in 1858 to look after policing of the whole town. They appointed 20 men; a further four were employed in 1874 when the Hove Commissioners (forerunners of Hove Borough Council) took over responsibilities, and by 1891 the force numbered 42 men. The amalgamation of Hove and Aldrington in 1893 prompted a further increase in the size of the force. Female officers were employed from 1919, and in 1938 the force numbered 90 men and women. The force was amalgamated with others in East Sussex (excluding Brighton Borough Police) in 1947 to form East Sussex Police. A new police station, incorporating flats for officers and an indoor rifle range, was built on Holland Road in 1964. It was closed in 2013 and converted into a school the following year. There is now a police "contact point" at the new Hove Town Hall on Norton Road.

Portslade had a resident police constable by 1851: he was recorded as lodging in a shepherd's house in that year's census. A police station was built on North Street by 1862 and police officers were then based there. The force was five strong by 1908, when a new police station was provided on St Andrew's Road. Numbers fluctuated between four and seven officers over the next decades. Both police stations survive, although since the formation of Sussex Police neither has been used by the police.

Brighton Parks Police, a separate force dedicated to patrolling parks and open spaces, was formed in 1961 by the Chief Constable of Brighton Borough Police. The roles of park keepers who were previously appointed under the terms of the Brighton Corporation Act 1831 were upgraded; the 14 officers were thereafter known as Park Constables and came under the control of a supervisor and an assistant supervisor. The force lasted until the early 1990s when it was abolished as a cost-cutting measure.

Between 1890 and 1988, when the institution moved to Goring-on-Thames, Berkshire, a convalescent home for police officers was based in Hove. It moved from its original building in Clarendon Villas to "huge red-brick" purpose-built premises on Portland Road in 1892. Police officers came from all over the country as well as from the local area to recover from illness and injuries. The home moved again to Kingsway on the seafront in 1966.

The history of policing in the Brighton area is covered by the Old Police Cells Museum in the basement of Brighton Town Hall.

== Courts and legal administration ==
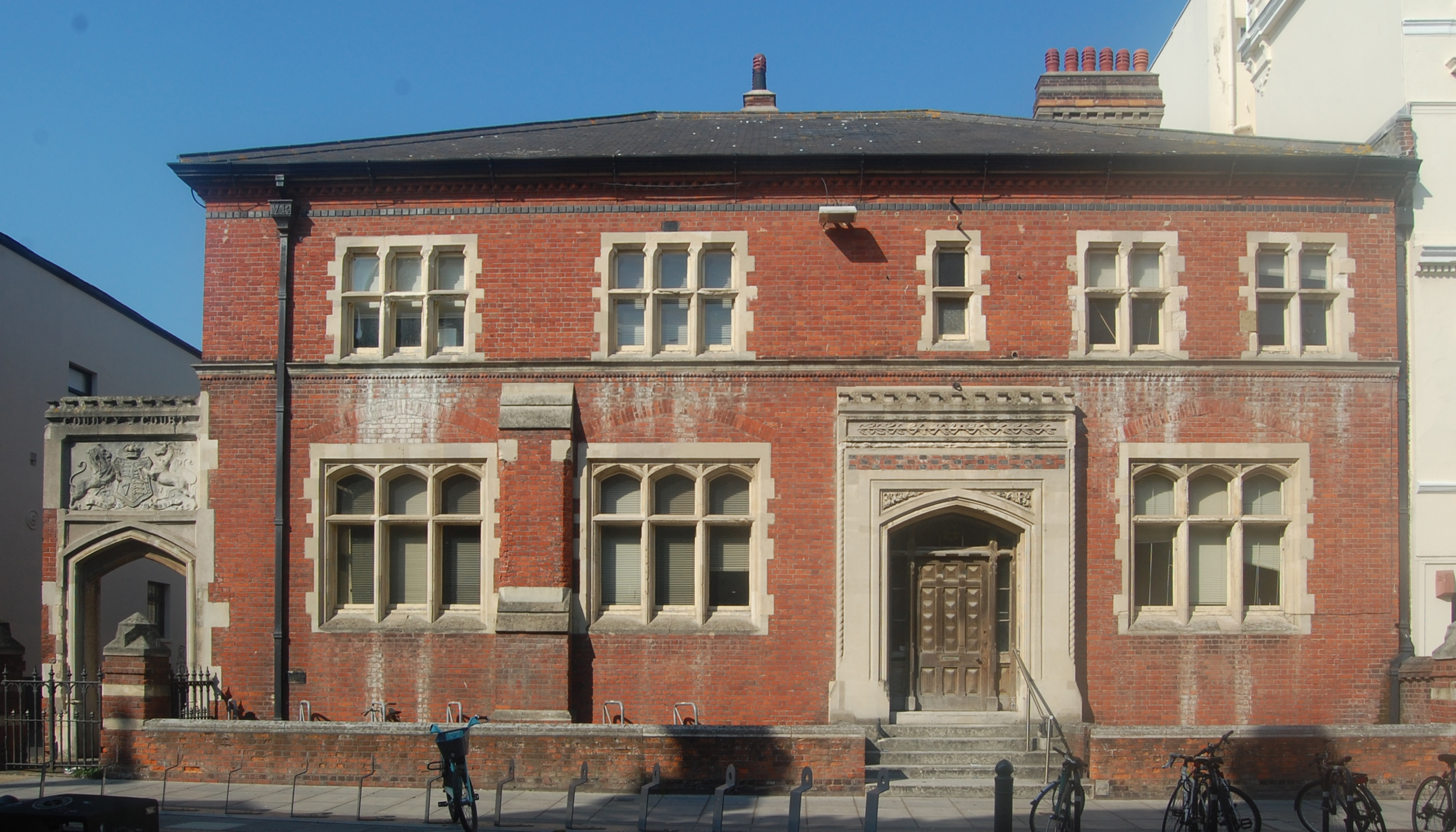
Brighton's County court was housed in this building on Church Street between 1869 and 1967.

Until 1808, the Hundred court responsible for enforcing the law and keeping the peace in Brighton was held at Lewes, the county town. From that year, the growing importance of Brighton prompted the establishment of a court (the Court of Whalesbone) at the New Inn (now the Royal Pavilion Tavern) on Castle Square on Mondays, Wednesdays and Fridays. Petty sessions were also held at the Old Ship Hotel starting in 1812. The venue alternated between the hotel, Brighton's original town hall and the New Inn until 1832, when the town hall became the court's permanent home. Brighton's court of quarter sessions was established at the town hall on 26 March 1854 and remained there except for a two-year period between 1897 and 1899 when they moved to the old library while the town hall was rebuilt. County court proceedings were held at the town hall from 1847; venues on North Street and Prince's Street were then used temporarily until a new building opened on Church Street in 1869. This two-storey red-brick Tudor/Gothic Revival structure had two courtrooms and remained in use until 1967, when a new £665,000 complex of juvenile, magistrate's, coroner's, county and Crown courts opened on Edward Street. It was designed in a Modernist style by Borough Architect Percy Billington. An extension was built to the rear in 1985, and the entire complex was refitted between 1986 and 1989 (necessitating a temporary move to the former Board of Guardians Parochial Offices on Prince's Street) to provide eight magistrate's courts and three Crown courtrooms (reduced to two before 2007). The old courthouse on Church Street, designed by Charles Sorby, is now Grade II-listed and is now used as a museum and lecture room.

The borough of Hove has had a magistrate's court since February 1904. It was based at the old Hove Town Hall, largely destroyed by fire in 1966. The court temporarily moved into an undamaged section before moving to its new permanent home, known as the Hove Trial Centre, in November 1971. Fitzroy Robinson & Partners designed the Modernist building, which cost approximately £350,000. The three-storey building has four courtrooms, a separate juvenile court and probation offices. The building also became the home of Hove Crown Court from October 1992.

== Fire protection ==
East Sussex Fire and Rescue Service is the statutory fire and rescue service covering the city of Brighton and Hove and the rest of East Sussex. It operates 24 fire stations, three of which are in the city: at Hove, Preston Circus and Roedean. All are part of the West Group of fire stations, which cover the city and the adjacent District of Lewes.

Preston Circus Community Fire Station covers central and western parts of Brighton. It has 61 full-time firefighters when fully staffed, and its equipment consists of an Extended Rescue Pump, an Aerial Ladder Platform and a Water Tender Ladder. Roedean Community Fire Station covers eastern Brighton and when fully staffed has a complement of 29 full-time firefighters. It is equipped with an Extended Rescue Pump. Hove Community Fire Station covers the Hove and Portslade areas. When fully resourced it has 53 full-time firefighters. It also has an Extended Rescue Pump and a High Volume Pump.

Until the passing of the Brighthelmston Improvement and Poor Relief Act 1825 (6 Geo. 4. c. clxxix), fire protection was offered by private fire insurance companies, supplemented by a "single primitive fire engine" owned by Brighton parish. It was not until 5 January 1831 that the requirements of the act were fulfilled by the formation of the Brighton Fire Establishment. It had 29 men, three fire engines and a fire ladder. Mains water was used to fight fires from the 1850s, by arrangement with the Constant Service Water Company, and by the following decade extra equipment had been provided and was stored at various locations around the town. From 14 October 1867, the Brighton Volunteer Fire Brigade supplemented it. They had 46 men and two fire engines. A bad fire in 1880 prompted the formation of a separate fire brigade by the local police force. The Brighton Police Fire Brigade was based at the town hall, and by 1898 there were 12 satellite stations throughout the town. In that year the headquarters moved to Church Street, and three years later a new building opened on the site of the present fire station at Preston Circus. The year after that the Police Fire Brigade also took over the volunteer brigade's premises.

Only in May 1921, following another serious fire in the town centre, were the three competing entities disbanded in favour of a "full-time, fully trained fire brigade" managed by Brighton Corporation. The Brighton County Borough Fire Brigade was based at the Preston Circus headquarters and had 45 firefighters and six fire engines. The satellite facilities at police stations around the town were closed in 1928 and replaced by a second dedicated fire station at Rottingdean, which had become part of the Borough of Brighton in that year. The Preston Circus fire station was rebuilt in its present form in 1938 to the design of architect Graeme Highet, and in February 1957 the Rottingdean fire station (which had been in a converted building) was closed and replaced with a purpose-built facility at Roedean. East Sussex County Fire Authority took over Brighton County Borough Fire Brigade on 1 April 1974.

A fire service was established in Hove in 1831 at the instigation of the Brunswick Town Commissioners, based at Brunswick Street West. A fire brigade was officially formed on 20 June 1863. The first purpose-built fire station was at 85 George Street, now a café. The brigade also covered Aldrington after the parish was added to Hove Borough. The George Street premises were extended c. 1908. The Borough of Hove officially took responsibility for the fire brigade on 1 November 1914 (it had the status of a volunteer brigade until then), and a new fire station was opened on Hove Street on 2 June 1926. The "elegant structure ... with a charming bell-cot" was designed by Brighton architects Clayton & Black and cost £11,000. East Sussex County Fire Authority took over the running of Hove fire brigade from 1 April 1948. The station on Hove Street closed in 1976 and was replaced by the current facility at English Close off Old Shoreham Road, which opened on 6 October of that year at a cost of £421,620.

Portslade Council established a 13-man volunteer fire brigade in April 1900. By 1932 attempts were being made to disband the brigade and rely on Hove's to cover Portslade, and in February 1937 it was stated that all of Portslade's firefighting equipment was obsolete and required costly replacement. After World War II East Sussex County Fire Authority took over control. The fire station was built in 1909 on Church Street by local builder Ernest Clevett to the design of A. Taylor Allen: an "attractive-looking building" of terracotta and white brick. It opened on 3 November 1909 and remained in use until the 1940s. East Sussex County Fire Authority inherited it when it took over the brigade but used it solely for the storage of equipment until disposing of it in 1972, after which it passed into commercial use.

== Healthcare ==
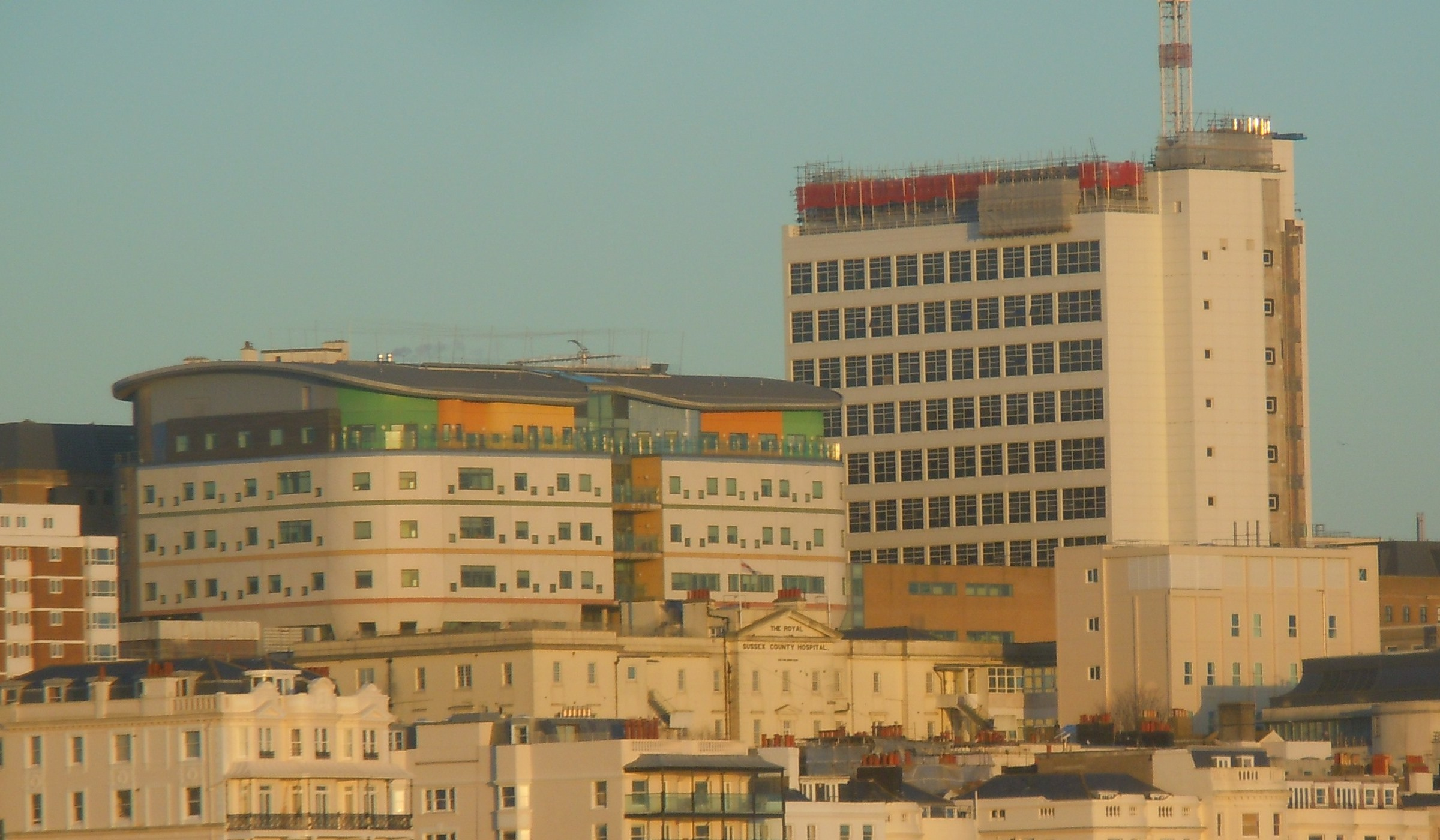
The Royal Alexandra Children's Hospital (left background) and the Royal Sussex County Hospital (foreground and right background) are on the same site in the Kemptown area of Brighton.

The city's publicly funded healthcare facilities are operated by University Hospitals Sussex NHS Foundation Trust and the Sussex Community NHS Foundation Trust, a community health trust. University Hospitals Sussex, which was formed on 1 April 2021 as a result of the merger of Brighton and Sussex University Hospitals NHS Trust and Western Sussex Hospitals NHS Foundation Trust, is an NHS foundation trust which provides clinical services at hospitals. It operates seven hospitals, including three in Brighton and Hove: the Royal Sussex County Hospital, the Royal Alexandra Children's Hospital and the Sussex Eye Hospital. The Sussex Community NHS Foundation Trust operates one hospital in the city—the Brighton General Hospital—as well as Hove Polyclinic and local clinics in the Carlton Hill area (Morley Street), Hollingbury (the County Oak Medical Centre), Mile Oak, Moulsecoomb, Portslade and Whitehawk.

The Royal Sussex County Hospital was founded on 16 March 1826 and opened as the Sussex County Hospital and General Sea-Bathing Infirmary on 11 June 1828. The original four-storey building had a capacity of 80 patients and was designed by Charles Barry; it became known as the Barry Building accordingly. Extensions were built in 1839, 1841 and 1853; a separate wing, the Jubilee Building, opened in 1887; and many other small extensions were made in the period before the NHS took responsibility for the hospital in 1948. A 14-storey tower opened in 1970 and expanded capacity significantly: by 1990 the hospital had more than 400 beds. Plans for a major rebuild were announced in 2009 with the aim of making the Royal Sussex "major trauma centre for Sussex and the South East". Under this scheme, the Barry and Jubilee Buildings were to be demolished and replaced by new facilities at a cost of £300 million. The anticipated cost later rose to £420 million and the expected completion date was 2019. In May 2014 £420 million of government money was committed to the scheme, and work began the same year. The completion date was extended further to 2024.

Brighton General Hospital opened on 1 November 1935 as Brighton Municipal Hospital in the buildings previously occupied by the borough workhouse. These were designed in 1865–67 by architect George Maynard. The present name was taken in 1948 when the hospital transferred to the NHS. An extension for postgraduate medical students was added in 1966, and by 1990 the hospital had nearly 500 beds. The site also houses Brighton's ambulance station, which was administered by Brighton County Borough Ambulance Service from 1948 until East Sussex County Council took over responsibility in 1974. In October 2018 the Sussex Community NHS Foundation Trust announced it would sell the main building, now Grade II-listed, for residential conversion, demolish the other buildings on the site and create a new "community health hub" housing all the existing services.

In 1980 Hove Borough Council sold an allotments site at Holmes Avenue in West Blatchington to the local health authority, and work on a new hospital was expected to start in 1984. Following delays and increases in the expected cost, a £40 million scheme was launched in May 1988 and approved by the Government in October 1989. New plans, on a much smaller scale than the general hospital which was originally intended, were approved in May 1994. Construction started in September 1996 and the three facilities on the site – Hove Polyclinic, Mill View Hospital and Nevill Hospital – opened in January 1998, June 1998 and August 1999 respectively. The total cost of the scheme was £11 million. The £5 million polyclinic, designed by Brighton architect Bryan Graham, offers various services such as outpatients' clinics, scans, minor surgery and physiotherapy. Mill View Hospital, designed by the firm of Powell Moya, offers mental health and psychiatric services. The 40-bed Nevill Hospital, whose building is shared with a private hospital and nursing home, replaced some of the original wards at Brighton General Hospital.

The Royal Alexandra Children's Hospital and the Sussex Eye Hospital are part of the Royal Sussex County Hospital site in Kemptown. The children's hospital, one of seven in Britain, opened in June 2007 and was designed by the Building Design Partnership firm. Work began in July 2004 and the project cost £36 million. It replaced a hospital of the same name on Dyke Road in the West Hill area which had been designed by local architect Thomas Lainson in 1880 and opened the following year. This had in turn superseded other buildings which had been used since June 1868, when a local doctor founded the hospital. Another prolific local architect, John Leopold Denman, designed the eye hospital. It opened in July 1935, replacing earlier facilities first established in 1832. The Classical-style building has 31 beds.

=== History ===
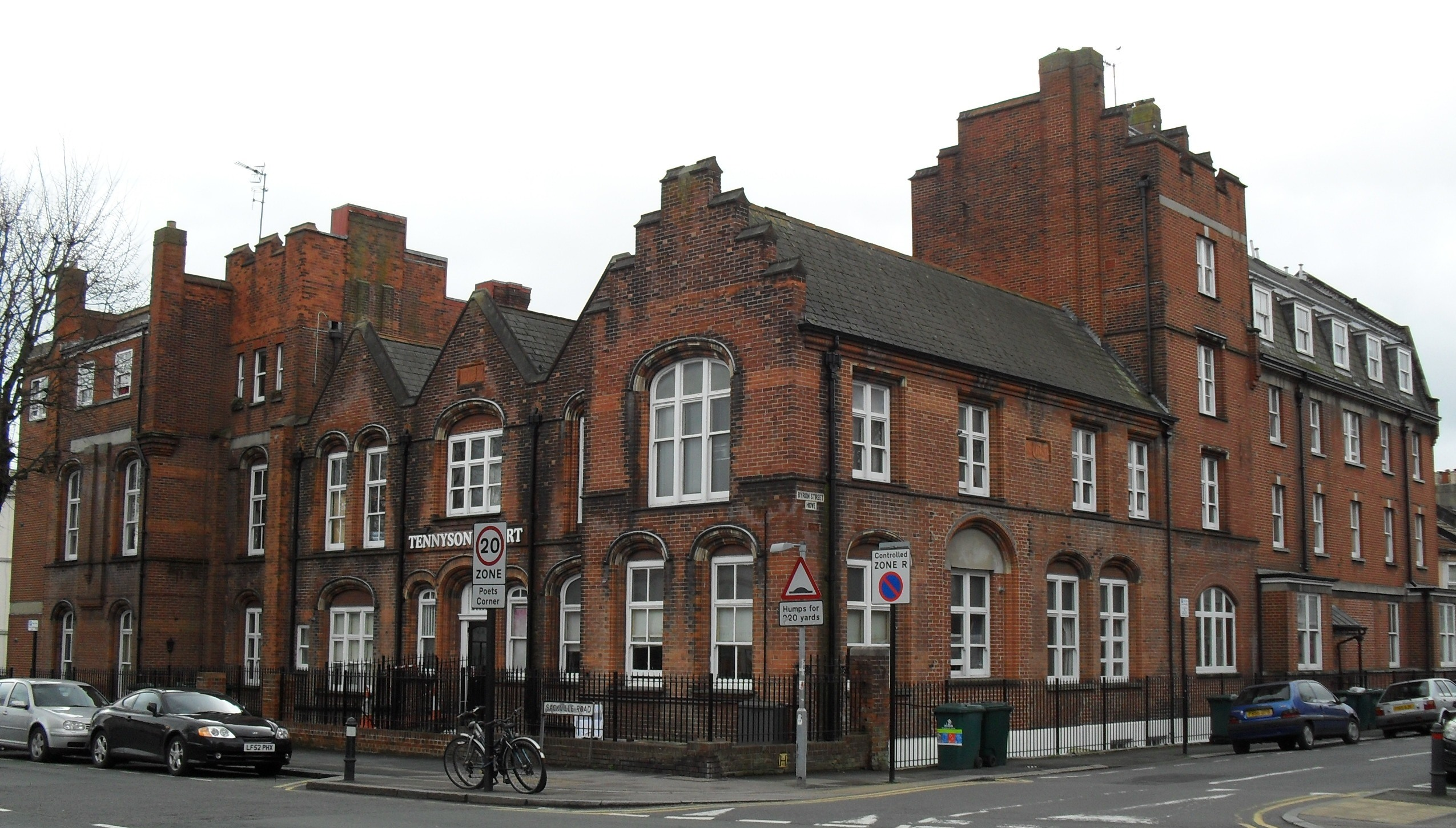
Hove General Hospital (now in residential use) was built between 1885 and 1888.

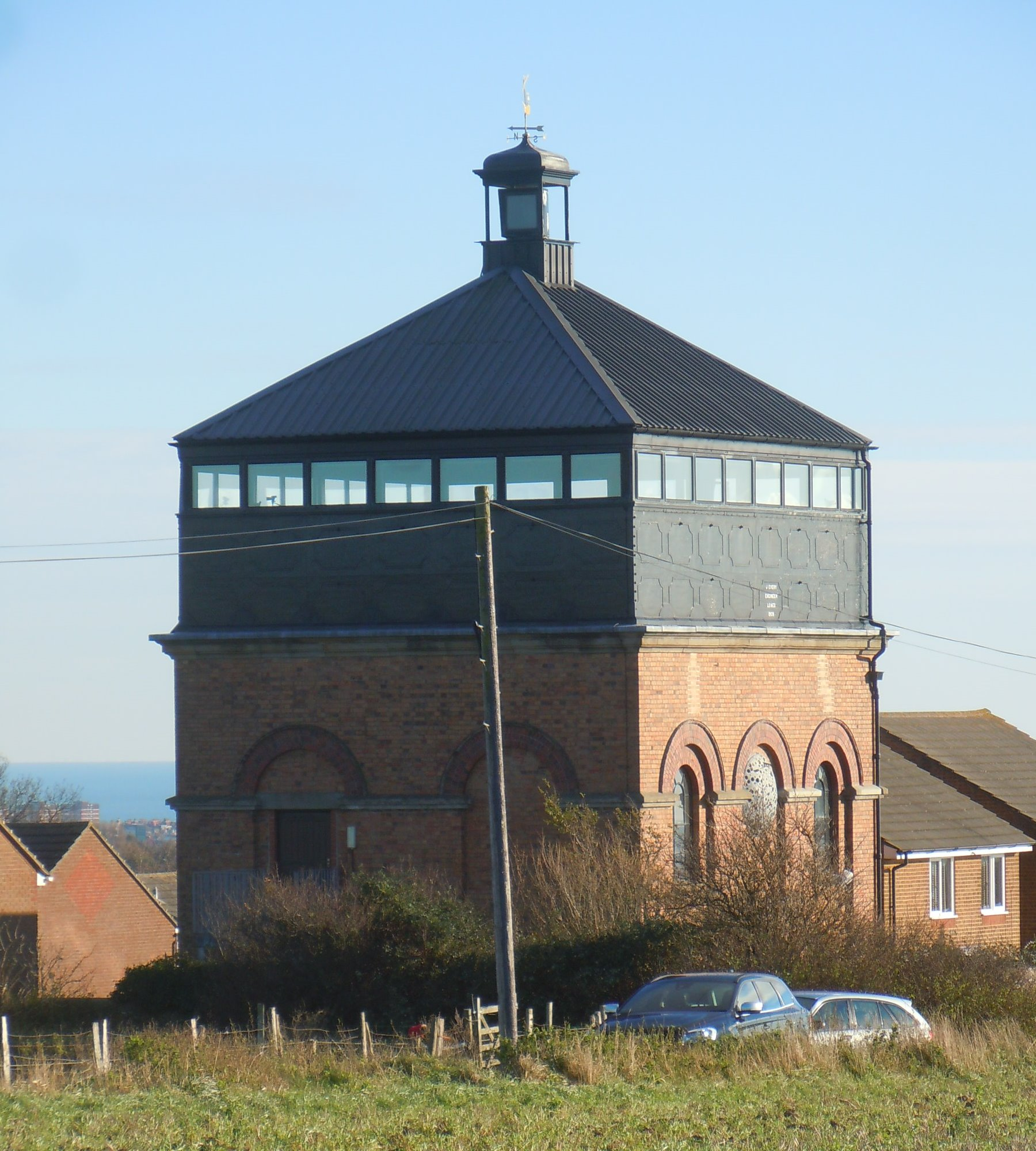
Only the water tower of the former Hove Borough Sanatorium survives.

The first dedicated healthcare institution in Brighton was the Brighthelmston Dispensary, sponsored by the Prince of Wales and opened on Nile Street in The Lanes in 1810. "Advice and medicine were given free", and doctors were available to visit patients' homes. Two years later the first hospital, the Sussex General Infirmary, opened. Together they occupied premises on Middle Street between 1819 and 1828, when the infirmary transferred to the newly opened Royal Sussex County Hospital. The dispensary moved again in 1849 to a new building on Queen's Road, where it remained until closure in 1930. The name changed to the Brighton and Hove Dispensary in 1859 when a branch opened in Hove; this was the forerunner of Hove General Hospital. A second branch opened in the Round Hill area in 1885. These two branches continued to operate, latterly under the name Brighton, Hove and Preston Dispensary, until 1948 when the NHS was formed. A second, similar dispensary opened in 1832 on Middle Street and moved to Queen's Road in 1878. It operated branches which served Rottingdean and Saltdean, the Black Rock area, Whitehawk, the Round Hill and Hollingdean areas, Hove and Portslade, and continued to run until the formation of the NHS. It was latterly known as the Brighton, Hove and Preston Provident Dispensary.

The first medical facility in Hove was the Brighton and Hove Dispensary (Western District) on Farm Road which opened in 1859, funded by collections at the two St Andrews' Churches on Church Road and Waterloo Street. Until then, patients requiring medical treatment had to travel to the Brighthelmston Dispensary. A proper hospital opened on 3 December 1888 on Sackville Road on a site bought three years earlier. The "classic example of Victorian architecture" was designed by the firm of Clarke and Micklethwaite. It took the name Hove Hospital in 1918, and extensions were built eight years later and again in 1934. The hospital began to decline in the 1970s: its casualty department closed in 1970, and a closure threat in 1986 was temporarily averted by protests. The Brighton Health Care NHS Trust, which ran it at the time, closed the hospital on 24 December 1997 and sold it the following month to a property developer for £550,000. It was converted into 37 flats and renamed Tennyson Court.

Dr Helen Boyle founded The Lewes Road Dispensary for Women and Children in 1899, offering free healthcare for women and children. Six years later Dr Boyle founded a hospital for the treatment of "nervous disorders"—a pioneering mental healthcare facility—on Roundhill Crescent nearby. The two merged, then moved to larger premises, and a second branch opened in Hove; both took the name Lady Chichester Hospital to commemorate their patron, Mary Pelham, Countess of Chichester. The Brighton branch's name changed to the New Sussex Hospital in the 1920s, by which time it was specialising in gynaecological disorders; it remained open, latterly on Windlesham Road in the Seven Dials area, and under NHS control until 1998. The Lady Chichester Hospital, which moved to Aldrington House on New Church Road in 1920, continued to specialise in mental healthcare. It also transferred to the NHS upon its formation and remained in use as a hospital until 1988, when its role changed to an outpatients centre and day centre.

A maternity hospital (The Lying-in Institution and Dispensary for Women and Children) opened in 1830 and transferred to a new site on West Street in 1854. A later name was the Brighton and Hove Women's Hospital. A final move took place in 1922, by which time it was known as the Sussex Maternity Hospital: it transferred to a former school building on Buckingham Road in the West Hill area. Branches existed at various times in Hove, the Carlton Hill area, the Elm Grove area and Whitehawk. All maternity services transferred to the Royal Sussex County Hospital in 1969–70 and the Buckingham Road building was demolished in 1976.

Bevendean Hospital in the Bear Road area originated as a smallpox isolation hospital called Brighton Borough Hospital: it opened during an outbreak in 1881. It later evolved into the Borough of Brighton's sanatorium, for which permanent buildings were built in 1898 and 1903. It became part of the NHS in 1948, and its remit later extended to mental healthcare and geriatric care. It closed in 1990 and was replaced two years later by The Sussex Beacon, the only healthcare facility in Sussex designed specifically for the care of people living with HIV/AIDS. In 1902 Brighton became the first place in the country to set aside a dedicated separate building for tuberculosis patients at its sanatorium.

Plans for another isolation hospital on the South Downs above Hangleton and Portslade were first announced in March 1882, and a design was provided by the Hove Borough Surveyor E.B. Ellis Clark. Work started on the building in 1883, and the 15-capacity facility opened in either 1884 or 1887. An extension was approved in 1890 and opened two years later. By 1913, when the hospital was officially known as the Hove Borough Sanatorium, there were 61 beds and patients with diseases such as tuberculosis, diphtheria, scarlet fever and typhoid fever were treated. The hospital was also used for the treatment of children with polio. In 1972 the buildings were converted for use as a hospital for disabled children, and it closed in 1986 and the patients were moved to smaller facilities in central Hove. Demolition took place in 1988–89. Only the water tower in the former grounds, built in 1909, survives; it was converted into a camera obscura in 1991 and is called Foredown Tower.

The Sussex Throat and Ear Hospital opened in 1879 and moved to the Royal Sussex County Hospital in 1986. It had successively occupied premises on Grenville Place, Queen's Road and Church Street. A separate dental hospital, the Brighton, Hove and Preston Dental Hospital, operated between 1886 and 1948. Founded on Marlborough Place, it later moved to Queen's Road and finally in 1931 to Buckingham Road.

The Brighton County Borough Asylum (renamed the Brighton County Borough Mental Hospital in 1919) took over the premises of the former Sussex County Asylum in Haywards Heath, north of Brighton, in 1903. As St Francis Hospital it became part of the NHS in 1948.

== Post and telephones ==
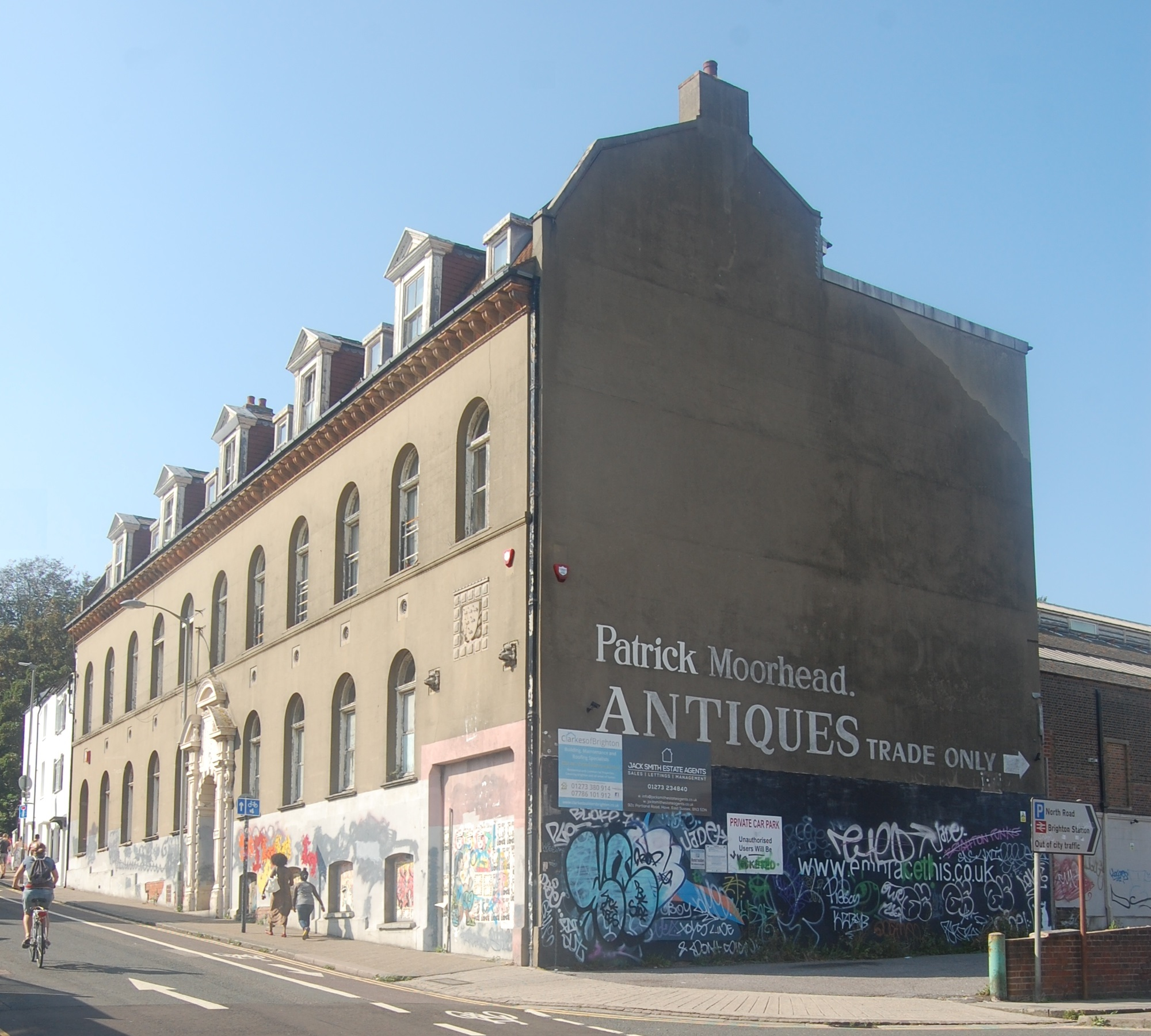
This former drill hall became Brighton's main postal delivery office.

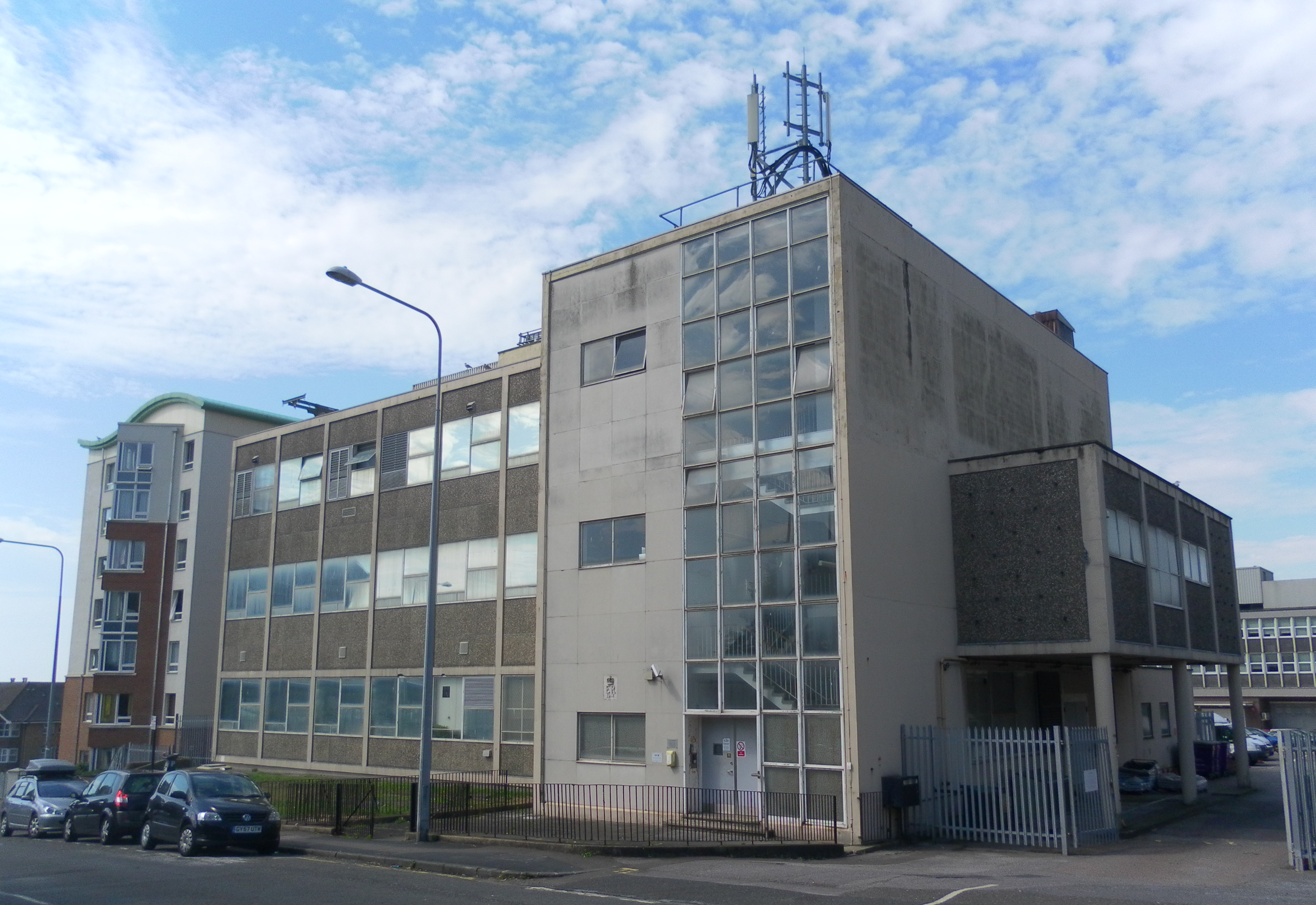
This telephone exchange stands on Freshfield Road in Kemptown.

Brighton is the centre of the Brighton postal district (BN). The BN postcode area covers the Sussex coast between Littlehampton and Pevensey and areas inland as far as Arundel, Hailsham and Hassocks. Over 1 million items of mail were dealt with daily in 1990 at the sorting office on North Road in the North Laine area. It moved there in 1926 and was extended in 1937 and 1967. The building, part of which is a Grade II-listed structure which was originally the Church Street drill hall, is now a local delivery office: the Gatwick Mail Centre in Crawley is now responsible for mail distribution to Brighton and the entire BN postcode area. Another local delivery office opened at Denmark Villas near Hove railway station in February 1993.

Brighton's Head Post Office opened on Ship Street in The Lanes in 1849 (the Old Ship Hotel had first been used as a postal house a century earlier) and was extended several times in the 19th century. It closed in 2007 and moved to smaller premises in the WHSmith store in the Churchill Square shopping centre. There was a post office in the old village of Hove by 1841. It later moved to Hove town hall, then in May 1893 a new head post office opened at 107 Church Road. It closed in March 1996 and moved to smaller premises on the same road. A "Post Office receiving house" was in operation in Portslade-by-Sea by 1852; it occupied various premises near the railway station until it found a permanent home at 10 Station Road in 1909. These premises became a sorting office when a new post office opened elsewhere on the street in March 1996. The old village of Portslade had its own post office on the High Street by 1904; it moved to South Street in the 1950s. A post office at Southern Cross, between Portslade-by-Sea and Portslade village, was first recorded in 1886.

Brighton has always been important in the distribution of mail across the historic county of Sussex. In 1874 it was recorded that every day, mail coaches travelled from the town along five principal routes and between them covered most of the county. There were seven coaches to Hove, Portslade and Shoreham-by-Sea; four continued to Bramber (of which one also served Steyning and another went to Steyning, Washington, Pulborough, Petworth and Midhurst) and two continued to Lancing and Worthing (one of which proceeded to Pulborough via Findon and Washington). Two coaches went eastwards along the coast to Rottingdean, one of which continued to Newhaven. On the main road to Lewes there were 18 coaches to Falmer and Lewes (plus one which only went as far as Falmer). From Lewes there were routes onwards to Plumpton; Firle and Berwick; Ringmer and thence variously to Framfield, East Hoathly, Chiddingly, Upper Dicker, Hailsham, Hellingly, Battle and Hastings; and Chailey with extensions to Newick, Fletching and Danehill. One coach went northwards over Ditchling Beacon to serve Ditchling and Keymer. The main route to the north, though, was along the main London road through Pyecombe, served by 18 coaches along four routes. Six coaches went on to serve Henfield, West Grinstead, Billingshurst, Cowfold, Lower Beeding and Horsham between them; two others ran to Bolney, with one extended to Crawley; one route served Hurstpierpoint; and nine coaches travelled daily to Keymer and Burgess Hill, eight of which continued to Haywards Heath with further extensions to Cuckfield, Lindfield, Ardingly and Horsted Keynes.

A locally controlled telephone network existed only until 1906, when Brighton Corporation's system was bought by the General Post Office (GPO). A rival national operator, the National Telephone Company, also operated in the area but was similarly taken over by the GPO in 1912, forming a state monopoly on telephone services.

Magnus Volk was the first Brighton resident to install a telephone: he connected up his house c. 1882. A telephone exchange opened in West Street in that year, and two years later a connection was made to the London network and thereby the rest of the country. Brighton's network became part of the National Telephone Company when that formed in 1889. It operated three exchanges in Brighton itself plus one in Preston village and one in Rottingdean. Brighton Corporation set up a rival network in 1903 with an exchange in the town centre. By 1905 it covered the whole of Brighton, Hove, Portslade and the surrounding area, but the following year it was taken over by the GPO. Additional telephone exchanges were built by the GPO in 1927 in central Brighton, Rottingdean, Preston village, Hove and Portslade. A new central exchange opened at Withdean in 1959 with other main exchanges in Hove and Kemptown (Freshfield Road). Hove had its own small network by 1889, when the police station, the chief constable's house and certain other premises were linked. Hove Cemetery also had a telephone line at that time. The main post office was connected by 1893 and the fire station by 1898. An underground trunk cable was laid between Brighton and Chichester in 1903, and substantial extensions were made between 1905 and 1907 to serve large parts of central Hove.

== Libraries ==
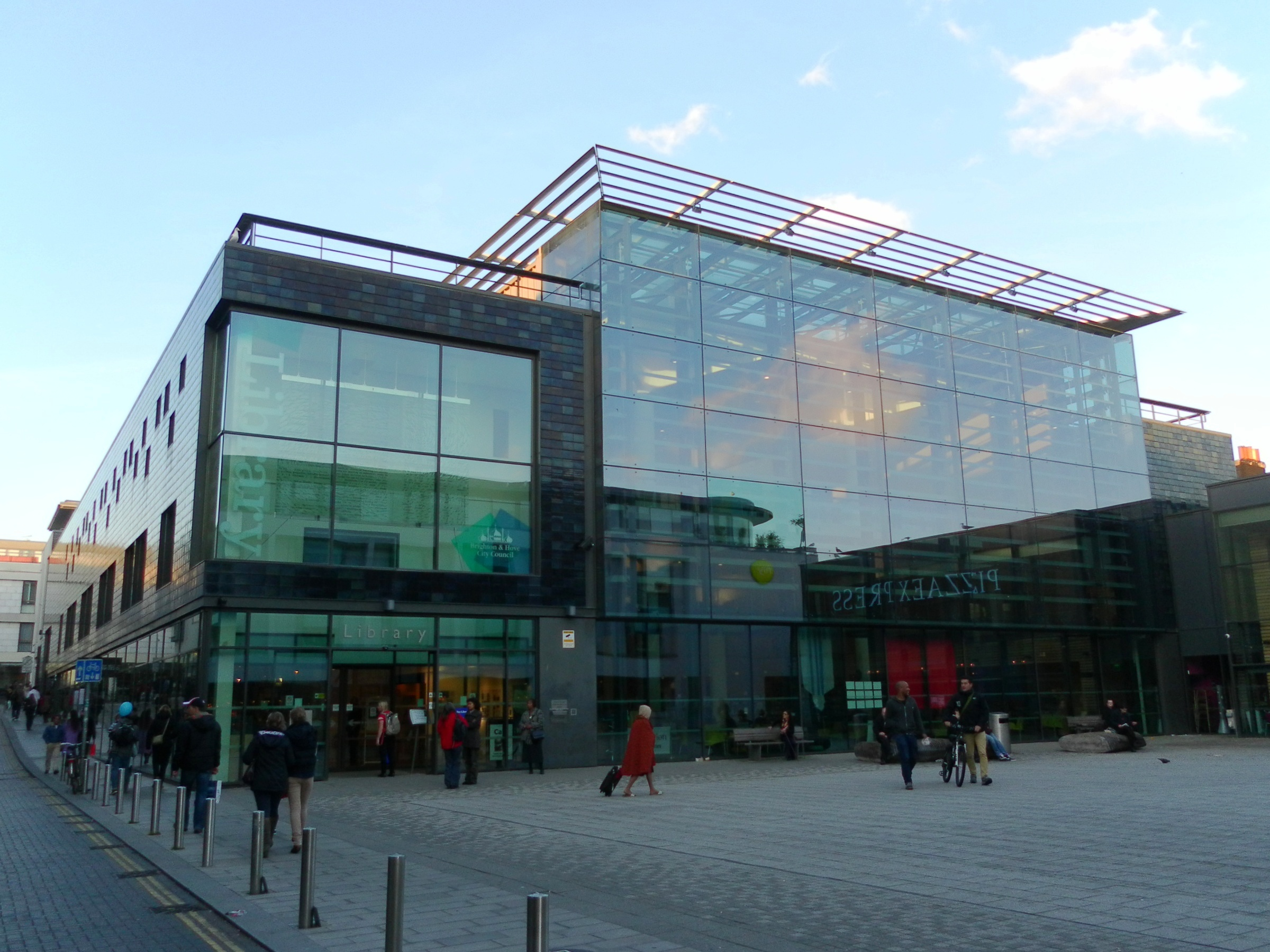
Jubilee Library opened in the centre of Brighton in 2005.

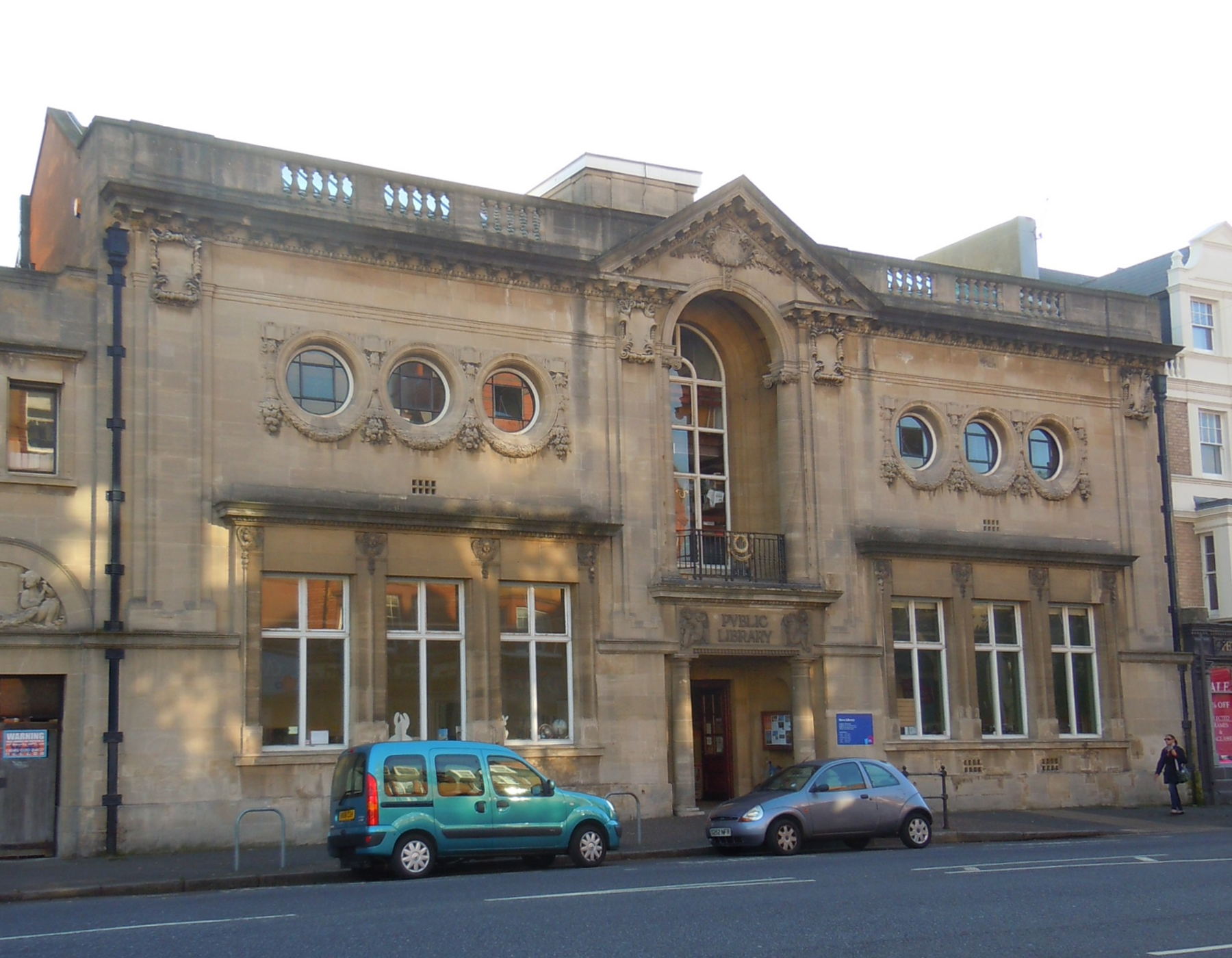
Hove Library was built in 1908.

Public libraries in the city are run by the Royal Pavilion, Museums and Libraries department of Brighton and Hove City Council. As well as the central libraries in Brighton (Jubilee Square) and Hove (Church Street), branch libraries—many of which have been rebuilt in the 21st century—operate on estates across the city. The council also operated a mobile library until 2013. Library membership gives borrowing rights at libraries throughout the city and is available to non-residents. Free internet access was introduced in 2001.

Brighton had many private, subscription and institutional libraries in the 18th and 19th centuries, but the first public library opened in 1869 in rooms at the Royal Pavilion. Two years later the former Royal Stables near the Pavilion were converted into a lending library, reference library, museum and art gallery. The premises were extended and reopened in 1901. Bequests by wealthy residents gave the reference library "one of the richest collections in the whole country" by the mid-20th century. Abortive attempts to create a new, centrally located, purpose-built library began in the 1960s and were not realised until 2001 when Brighton and Hove City Council signed a PFI contract in 2001. Jubilee Library, the centrepiece of a mixed-use redevelopment in the North Laine district, opened in March 2005 at a cost of £14 million. It is a distinctive Modernist building: a "carefully wrought [and] striking ... translucent glass box".

Hove Borough Council acquired a house on Grand Avenue in 1890 and adapted it to form a public library. As at Brighton, many of the books were donated or bequeathed by wealthy residents. The library moved to another site in 1900, and three years later Andrew Carnegie provided an endowment of £10,000 to allow the construction of a permanent building. A design submitted by Leeds architects Percy Robinson and W. Alban Jones won the architectural competition, which was held in 1906, and Hove Library opened in 1908.

Several of Brighton's estates have branch libraries. The 18th-century Moulsecoomb Place was used as a library for the Moulsecoomb estate from 1929 until a purpose-built facility replaced it in 1964. Patcham's original library building dated from 1933 and served for 80 years until the present combined library and community centre opened in 2013. The first library in Whitehawk opened in 1934 and was replaced twice; a third new building, the Whitehawk Community Hub, came into use in 2011. Woodingdean had temporary library facilities from 1940 until 1959, when a permanent building opened; this was in turn demolished and replaced with a larger facility in 2013. Rottingdean's library has been housed in the 18th-century former vicarage since the 1950s. A prefabricated former pub on the Hollingbury estate was turned into a branch library in 1962. Westdene's purpose-built library opened in 1964. The following year part of Saltdean Lido on the Saltdean estate was converted into a library and community centre. The Coldean estate was the last to get a library: one opened in 1975 and was replaced by a larger building in 2008. Within the former Borough of Hove, there are libraries at Hangleton, Portslade and Mile Oak. The church hall of Hounsom Memorial Church on the Hangleton estate was used as a library from 1945 until 1962, when the present premises opened. Portslade's Modernist library was completed in 1964. A small library facility was provided at Portslade Aldridge Community Academy on the Mile Oak estate from 1975; it was rebuilt on a larger scale, still on the college campus, in 2014.

== Gas and electricity supply ==
Brighton's first permanent electricity supply was launched on 27 February 1882, five weeks after the Hammond Electric Light and Power Company set up the first part of its supply system. Its generator was on North Road in the North Laine area. The Brighton Electric Light Company, which added "and Hove" to its name in 1888, bought the Hammond company in 1885 and expanded the network, also changing it from direct current to alternating current and installing more generators at the North Road site. Brighton Corporation built its own small power station nearby in Church Road in 1891 , and three years later it acquired the Brighton and Hove Electric Light Company. In response to growing demand for electricity, the corporation then purchased land at Southwick, west of Portslade, in 1902 for the construction of a larger power station. It opened in June 1906. In 1927 a new trunk main was laid from the station to central Brighton to serve Portslade, Hove and Brighton. The power station was renamed Brighton A in the 1950s when it was supplemented by a second station, Brighton B, on which work started in 1947. Its total output was 330 megawatts. Brighton A closed in 1976 and was demolished in 1980, and Brighton B stopped generating power in March 1987 and was demolished between 1988 and 1990. Its site is now occupied by the new Brighton Power Station (also known as Shoreham Power Station), built at a cost of £200 million between July 1999 and February 2001. The North Road facilities were downgraded to a substation in 1911; the buildings stood until they were demolished in 1986. Other substations were built at Roedean, Hollingdean and Preston Park in the 1920s.

The Hove Commissioners, forerunners of the local council, "began to take electricity seriously" in the 1880s. An Electric Lighting Committee was formed in April 1890 to consider the options. A private company, the Hove Electric Lighting Company, was formed shortly afterwards: its first act was to buy land at the junction of Holland Road and Davigdor Road to build a generating station, followed by the laying of mains. This started in 1893 and was still going on when the Commissioners bought out the company in 1914. Work also started in Aldrington parish around this time. A second generating station operated at Leighton Road in Hove between 1902 and 1928. The Holland Road facility was demolished in the 1980s and the site was redeveloped. Portslade residents were supplied by Brighton Corporation but paid a surcharge until 1931.

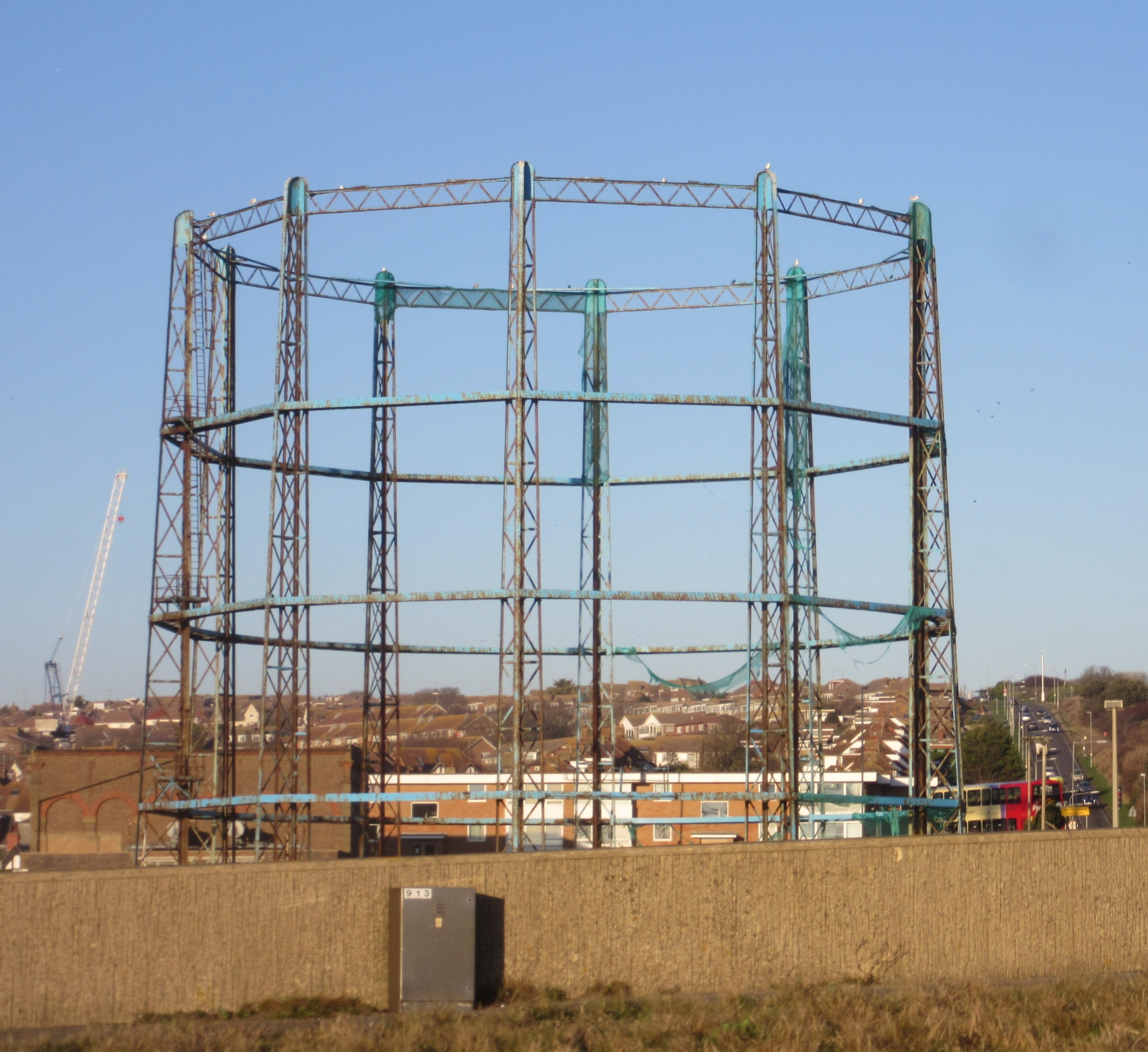
This gasholder still stands at the former Black Rock gasworks.

The Brighton Gas Light and Coke Company was formed in 1818 and built a works at Black Rock, just over the parish boundary in Rottingdean. A separate company, the Brighton and Hove Gas Company, was established in 1825 and built a gasworks of its own next to St Andrew's Church in Hove in 1832. Houses in Brunswick Terrace were the first to be lit by gas. Production moved to a new gasworks at Portslade in 1871 and the Hove works became a storage facility. Increasing demand for gas meant a new 154 by 40 feet (47 m × 12 m) gasholder, one of the largest in Sussex, was built on the site in 1877. Of novel construction for the time, it was used until September 1994. Demolition was proposed in 1998; by 2002 no work had taken place, but the development—consisting of a Tesco supermarket and car park—started the following year. The gasworks at Black Rock was also downgraded to a storage facility in 1885, three years after the Brighton and Hove Gas Company absorbed its older rival. It also acquired the gas companies of Worthing in 1931 and Littlehampton in 1934: as a result the Portslade works supplied gas to a large part of the Sussex coast. The Portslade facility was on the foreshore next to the boundary of Aldrington parish. The site and all construction work cost £72,000. Its proximity to Shoreham Harbour meant that coal could be transported to it directly. Several extensions were built, and production rose from just over 1,000,000 cubic feet of gas per day in 1880 to a peak of 65,000,000 cubic feet per day. By 1971 output had dropped to 10,000,000 cubic feet per day and the gasworks closed. Demolition followed immediately. The two surviving gasholders at Black Rock are not used regularly, and the site has been allocated for redevelopment for commercial and residential use by Brighton and Hove City Council.

The local electricity companies were nationalised in 1948 and became part of the South Eastern Electricity Board (SEEBOARD), which was headquartered at Princes House (Note: Now known as Kings House.) on Hove seafront. Similarly, the Brighton, Hove and Worthing Gas Company (as it was now known) became part of the South Eastern Gas Board in 1949 upon nationalisation of the gas industry. The electricity boards were privatised in 1990, and SEEBOARD is now part of the distribution network operator UK Power Networks. The regional gas boards were brought together into a state monopoly, British Gas Corporation, under the terms of the Gas Act 1972; this was also subsequently privatised under the terms of the Gas Act 1986.

== Water supply, drainage and sewerage ==
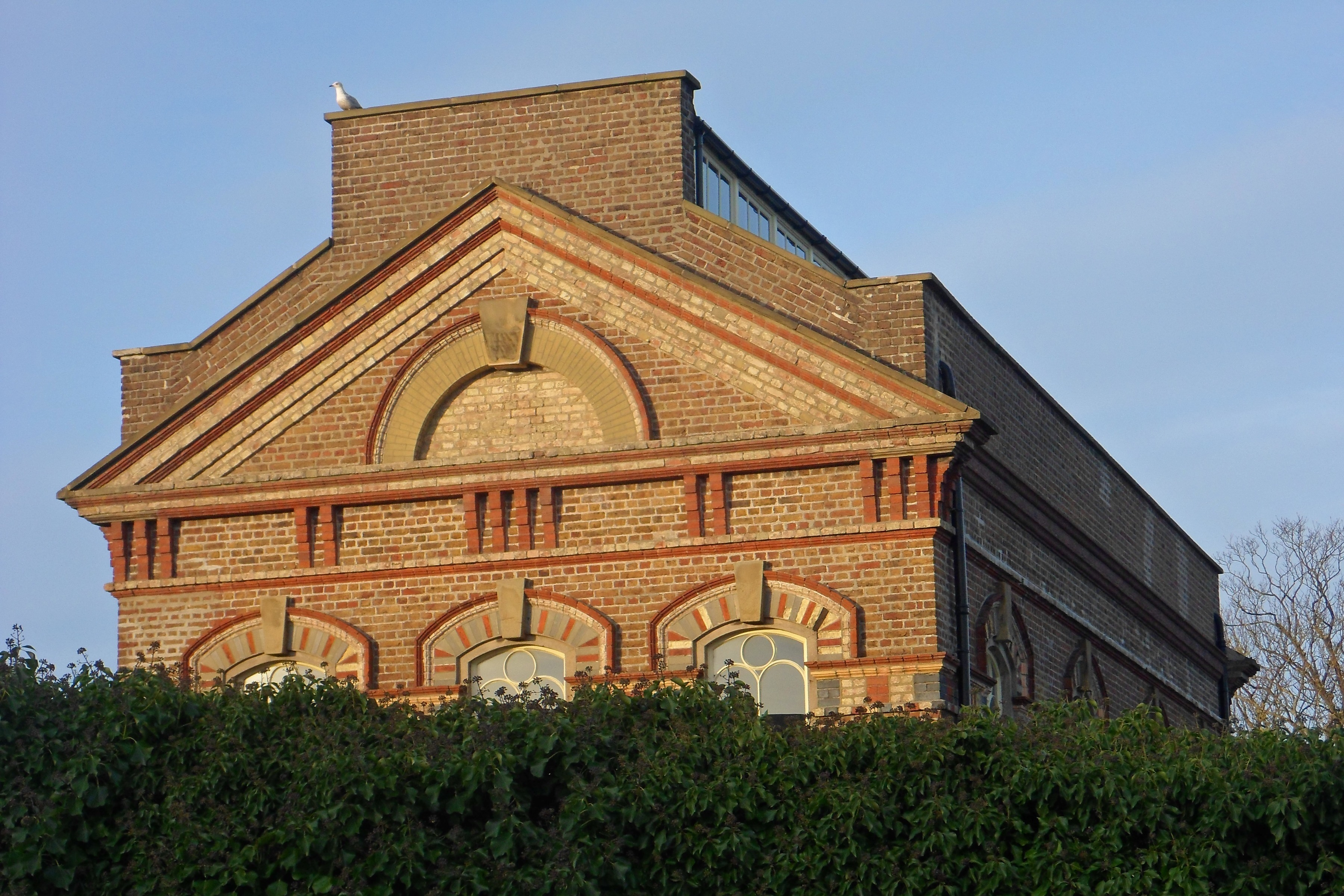
Goldstone pumping station (1876) has been turned into an industrial museum.

The privately owned utility company Southern Water is responsible for both the supply and distribution of water and the collection and treatment of wastewater and sewage in the city of Brighton and Hove. The Southern Water Authority, the private company's predecessor, took over these responsibilities from the Waterworks Department of Brighton Corporation in 1974 under the terms of the Water Act 1973. The publicly owned authority was privatised in 1989. Predecessors of the corporation's Waterworks Department, which served Brighton, Hove and all other areas of the present-day city, have existed since 1834.

Brighton and Hove sit on "a huge natural reservoir" of "naturally clear and odourless water" by virtue of their position on and immediately below the South Downs, which consist of highly porous chalk. Accordingly, wells were used for centuries to supply water. The Woodingdean Water Well, the world's deepest hand-dug well, was sunk in 1858 to supply water to the workhouse on Elm Grove; it can still be seen on Warren Road. Legal measures to prevent contamination of the water supply were recorded in the medieval era, and Brighton's principal well existed by 1621, when it was recorded as having a well house erected over it. It was on North Street on the edge of the old town, and there were subsidiary public wells at The Knab (Note: Now known as Brighton Place in The Lanes.) (1727), West Street (blocked up in 1792), East Street, Market Street and Pool Valley. Hove was known to have had one well by 1628 and two by 1640. The older well was still visible in the early 19th century, by which time erosion had brought the beach up to meet it (it was originally on Hove Street). The other well was further north on the same street. The wells were stopped up in 1705 (after contamination caused by the Great storm of 1703) and 1876 respectively. Other wells existed in Hove at Davigdor Road, Osborne Villas, Denmark Villas and Goldstone Bottom (later the site of the Goldstone pumping station), and there were numerous private wells. Portslade had wells at South Street (the oldest, in existence by 1706), High Street and Foredown Road. West Blatchington had a public well by the manor house, and there was one in Stanmer village from the 16th century; both were deep enough to require donkey wheels, (Note: A type of treadwheel operated by a donkey, the power from which hauled the bucket up from the well.) and the well house and donkey wheel at Stanmer survive. Rottingdean had an ancient well on the village green; it still exists, supplying water to the village pond. The surviving well serving Preston village, adjacent to Preston Manor, dates from the 1730s.

The Brighton, Hove and Preston Waterworks Company was founded in 1834 as a private company. It supplied a small number of houses from its well and pumphouse on the Lewes Road. The supply was improved in 1853 when more tunnels were cut into the chalk, and in the same year a rival company was formed to extend the water supply further into Brighton and Hove. The Brighton, Hove, and Preston Constant Service Waterworks Company bought the Waterworks Company in 1854 and opened the large Goldstone Pumping Station at Goldstone Bottom in Hove in 1866. Three smaller private companies also existed in the Brighton area at this time, remaining outside the Constant Service Company's control.

Brighton Corporation Waterworks Act 1872
- Act of Parliament
- Parliament of the United Kingdom
- Long title: An Act for vesting the Undertaking of the Brighton, Hove, and Preston (Constant Service) Waterworks Company in the Corporation of Brighton, and for extending the Limits for the Supply of Water to certain Neighbouring Places; and for other purposes.
- Citation: 35 & 36 Vict. c. lxxxvi

Dates
- Royal assent: 18 July 1872
Other legislation
Repealed by	Brighton Corporation Act 1931

Status: Repealed

Brighton Corporation Waterworks Act 1883
- Act of Parliament
- Parliament of the United Kingdom
- Long title: An Act to enable the Corporation of Brighton to raise further Moneys for their Waterworks Undertaking.
- Citation: 46 & 47 Vict. c. ciii

Dates
- Royal assent: 16 July 1883
Other legislation
Repealed by	Brighton Corporation Act 1931

Status: Repealed

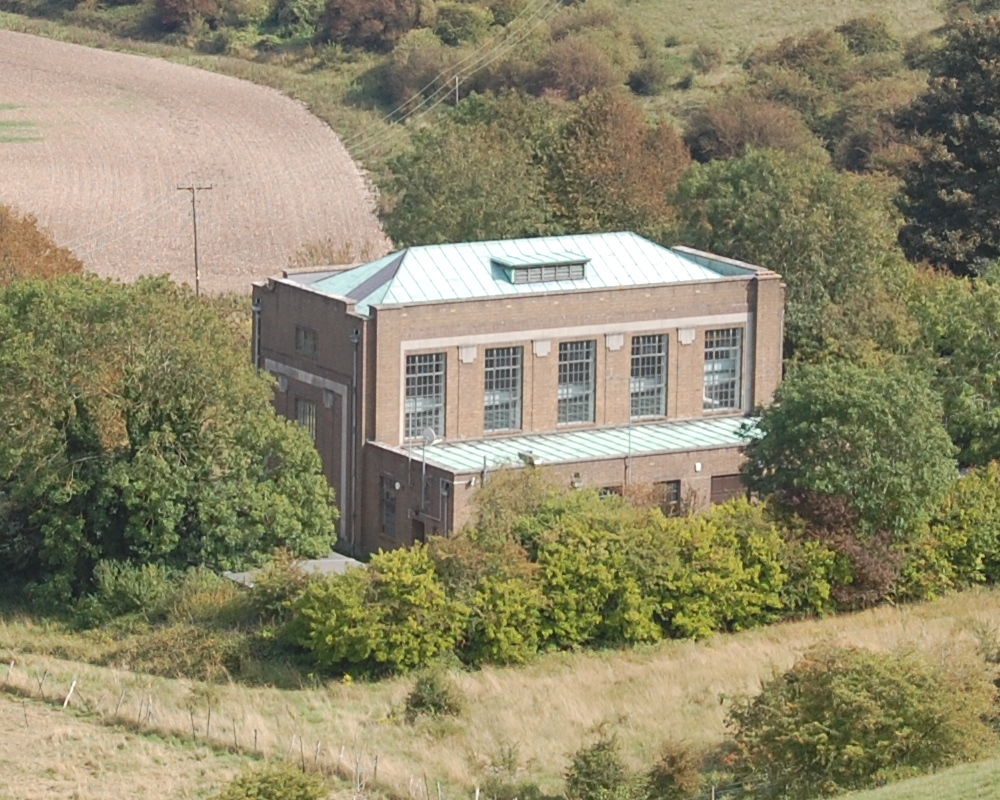
The pumping station at Balsdean opened in 1936.

The Brighton Corporation Waterworks Act 1872 (35 & 36 Vict. c. lxxxvi) was passed to allow the corporation to buy the Brighton, Hove, and Preston Constant Service Waterworks Company for £321,000. By that time it was supplying 18,000 customers across Brighton and the surrounding villages of Rottingdean, Ovingdean, Falmer, Preston, Patcham and Hangleton. It purchased the other three private companies in the area in 1876, 1896 and 1897 respectively, and in 1876 it expanded the capacity of the Goldstone Bottom facility by installing a second pumping engine. Further expansion was needed, and the corporation built new pumping stations at Patcham, Mile Oak and Falmer by 1904. Another opened on Lewes Road in 1896 but became so polluted that it went out of service seven years later, prompting the corporation to take action to prevent contamination—principally by purchasing vast swathes of the open downland to regulate land use close to the pumping stations. In 1936 a site high on the South Downs at Balsdean was chosen for Brighton's first electrically powered pumping station; others were opened outside the borough in the 1950s and 1960s, while the older facilities within the borough were modernised and extended. By the time the corporation's Waterworks Department was taken over by the Southern Water Authority, it was responsible for supplying 18,000,000 US gallons (68,000,000 L) per day to customers in an area stretching west to Lancing and east beyond Lewes as well as throughout the boroughs of Brighton and Hove. In 1967 a new headquarters building had opened at Falmer; this is still one of Southern Water's main offices. All of the 19th- and early 20th-century facilities have been demolished except for Goldstone pumping station, which has been converted into the British Engineerium. Several of its structures have been awarded listed status, including its chimney, boiler room and engine houses, cooling pond and leat.

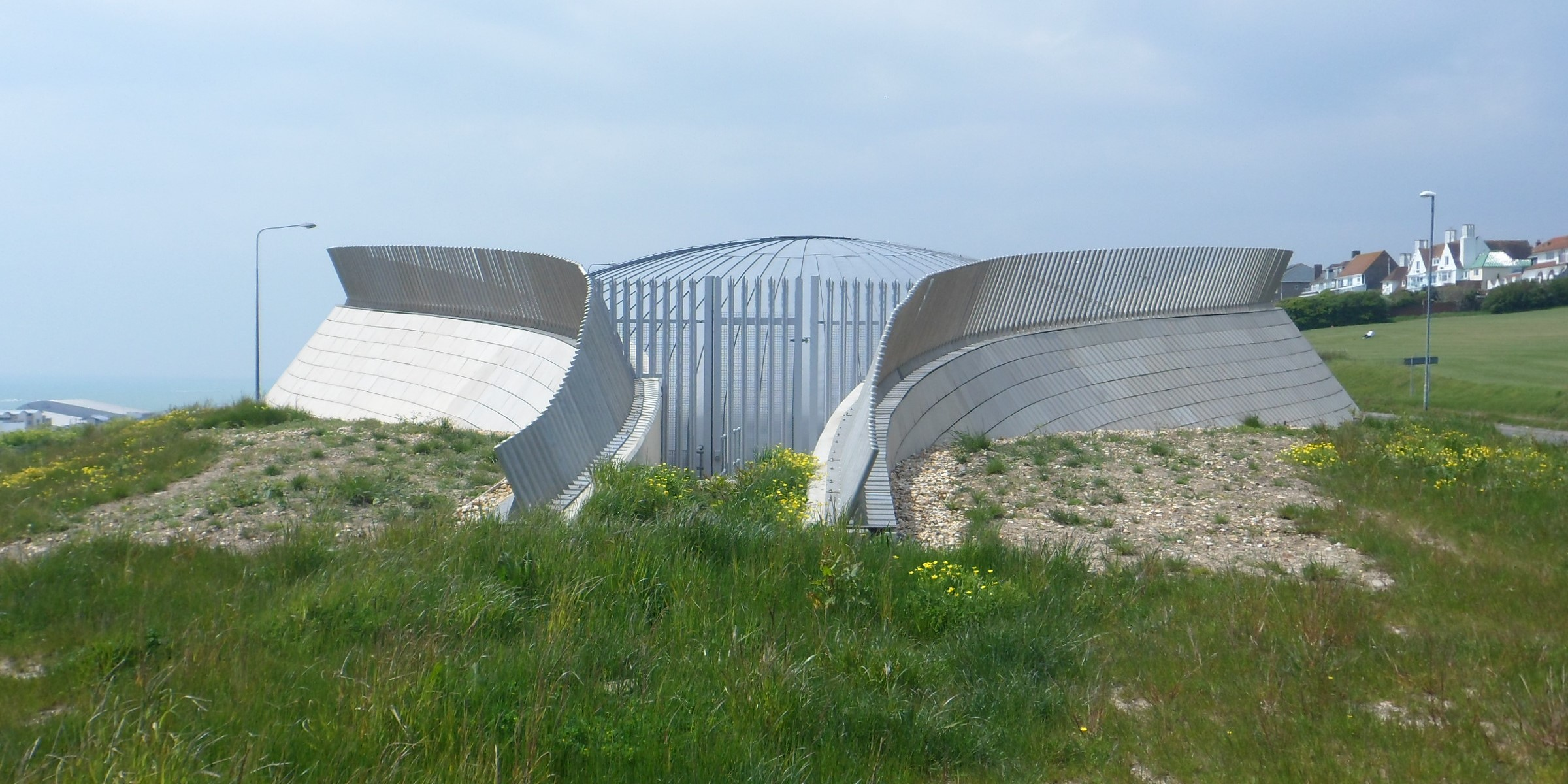
The sewage pumping station at Marine Drive is part of Southern Water's sewerage facilities in the city.

Reservoirs were created at Cock Roost Hill and East Hill near Mile Oak, and there is a covered one in the Hanover area of Brighton. This was created by the Brighton, Hove and Preston Constant Service Company, which is commemorated in the name of the nearby Constant Service pub.

Drainage, sewerage and wastewater disposal in the city are the responsibility of Southern Water. Brighton and Hove lies within the Adur and Ouse Catchment Area, one of 11 river basin catchments within Southern Water's area of operation. The Peacehaven water treatment works at Peacehaven, just beyond the eastern boundary of the city, is the largest of 68 water treatment works in the catchment area and serves most parts of the city. The Poynings, Pyecombe East, Pyecombe West and Shoreham water treatment works serve outlying areas. The Peacehaven works, which incorporates a sludge treatment centre, has approximately 873.6 miles (1,405.9 km) of sewers connected to it and discharges treated wastewater into the English Channel. Construction work started in July 2009 and the facility opened in October 2013 at a cost of £300 million. It can treat 95,000,000 litres (25,000,000 US gal) of wastewater per day. As part of the project a sewage pumping station was built on Marine Drive in the Black Rock area of Brighton. It sits on the cliffs above Brighton Marina and was "designed as a landmark feature, providing a gateway into the city from the east", but set low into the landscape in order to blend in. It consists of a domed structure set between two curved berms.

The first proper drainage facility in Brighton was constructed beneath Old Steine in 1792–93, although it functioned both as a sewer and as a culvert for the intermittent Wellesbourne river. Most waste was disposed of in cesspits, and a critical report by civil engineer Edward Cresy in 1849 made many recommendations about improving the situation. In 1852 an existing rainwater drain which ran underground from Hove to the Royal Albion Hotel, draining on to the beach through short outfall pipes, was extended to a new, longer outfall at Black Rock and was connected to a sewer serving the Kemp Town estate. More work was carried out after another report in 1859 and in 1866, when a proper sewer was laid under the Lewes Road. A full system of sewers, including a 7-mile (11 km) intercepting sewer from Hove to a location beyond the Brighton borough boundary at Telscombe Cliffs, was built between 1871 and 1874 by civil engineer John Hawkshaw. Further extensions were made in 1892 and 1928. The Southern Water Authority, the predecessor of the present Southern Water, took responsibility for the facilities in 1974; previously a body called the Brighton Intercepting and Outfall Sewers Board looked after them. Brighton's network of Victorian sewers were for many years a tourist attraction and could be visited by the public by arrangement with Southern Water, although by 2022 tours no longer operated.

== Waste disposal ==
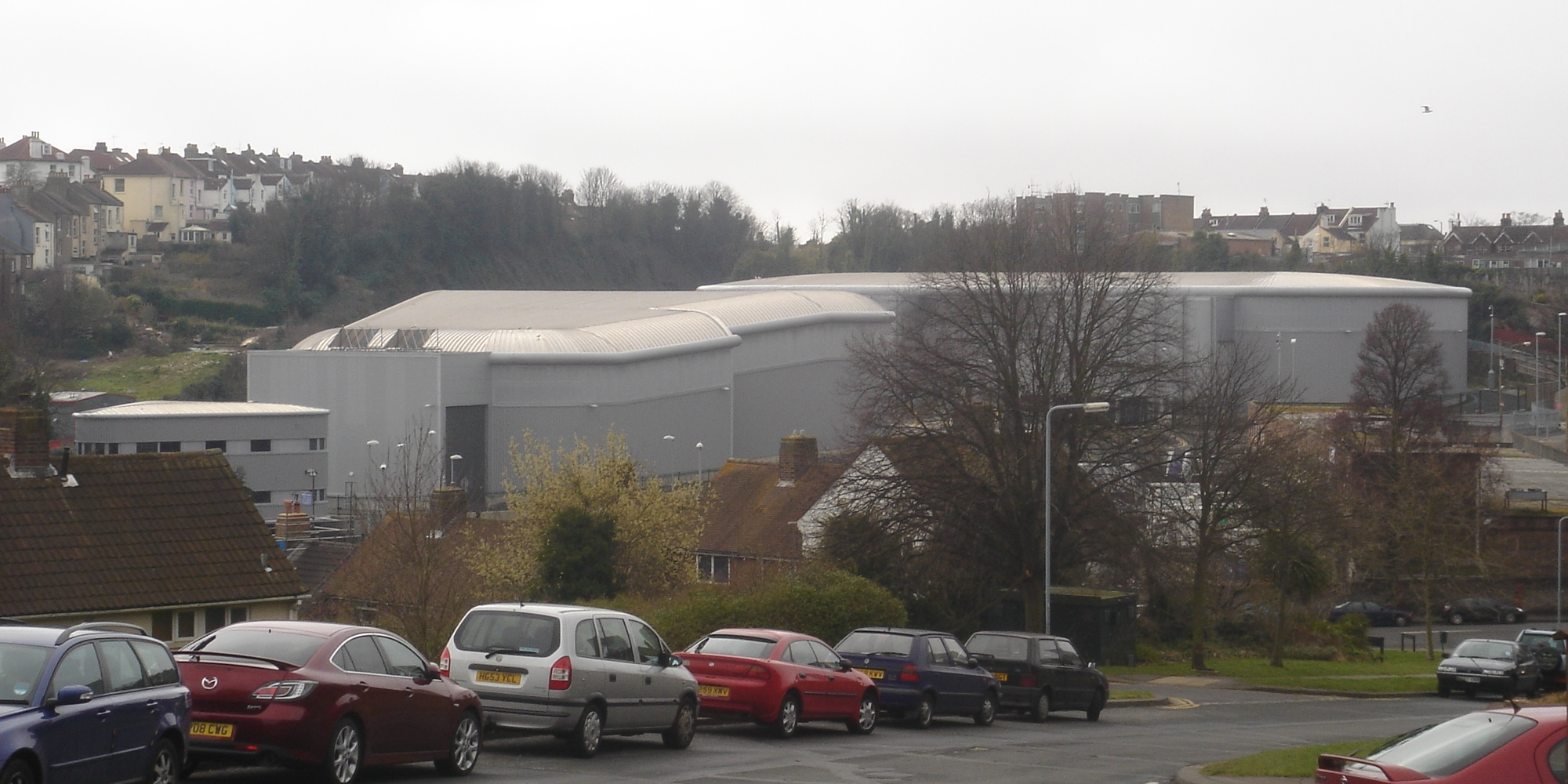
Veolia's refuse disposal facility at Hollingdean Depot.

Waste disposal, recycling and street cleaning in the city are the responsibility of a council department called City Clean, who are based at Hollingdean Depot. Household recycling sites at Hove (Old Shoreham Road) and Whitehawk (Wilson Avenue), which accept large items, electrical goods and garden waste, are managed by private utility company Veolia on behalf of the council. The council also offers bulky waste collection and garden waste collection services, and provides special bins at various points along the seafront for the disposal of barbecues. Traders and businesses can use the council's trade waste disposal and recycling services.

As of 2021 there were about 600 communal refuse bins and 1,650 communal recycling bins (150 for glass and 1,500 for plastic, cardboard and other materials) in the city. Approximately 209 tonnes of refuse and recycling were collected by refuse operatives each day. The largest communal bins, mostly in on-street city-centre locations, have a capacity of 3,200 litres (850 US gal) and are emptied by a fleet of diesel-powered side-lifting refuse collection vehicles. In May 2022 the council announced a plan to replace five of these vehicles with four new electric-powered vehicles by 2023 or 2024. At that time there were already two electric-powered rear-lifting refuse collection vehicles in the fleet.

The site of the present City Clean depot at Hollingdean has been associated with refuse disposal for more than 200 years. It was originally the site of the Brighton parish "dust-yard" where rubbish and excrement collectors called scavengers, appointed by the Brighton Commissioners under the terms of the Brighthelmstone Improvement Act 1810 (50 Geo. 3. c. xxxviii), took the materials they collected. A "dust destructor" was built at the site in 1886 to incinerate the refuse and produce clinker which was used by Brighton Corporation for the construction of pavements and similar. It went out of use in 1952 and was demolished; the present Veolia facility was built later and the remaining land is used as a depot by the council. The tip and recycling site at Wilson Avenue, called Sheepcote Valley, opened when the dust destructor was closed. Around the early 1980s waste began to be dumped in the landfill site at Beddingham near Lewes run by East Sussex County Council. The Beddingham Facility closed in 2009 when it became full. Since 2012 Brighton and Hove's refuse has been incinerated at the Newhaven ERF which produces electricity for the surrounding area.

== Cemeteries and crematoria ==
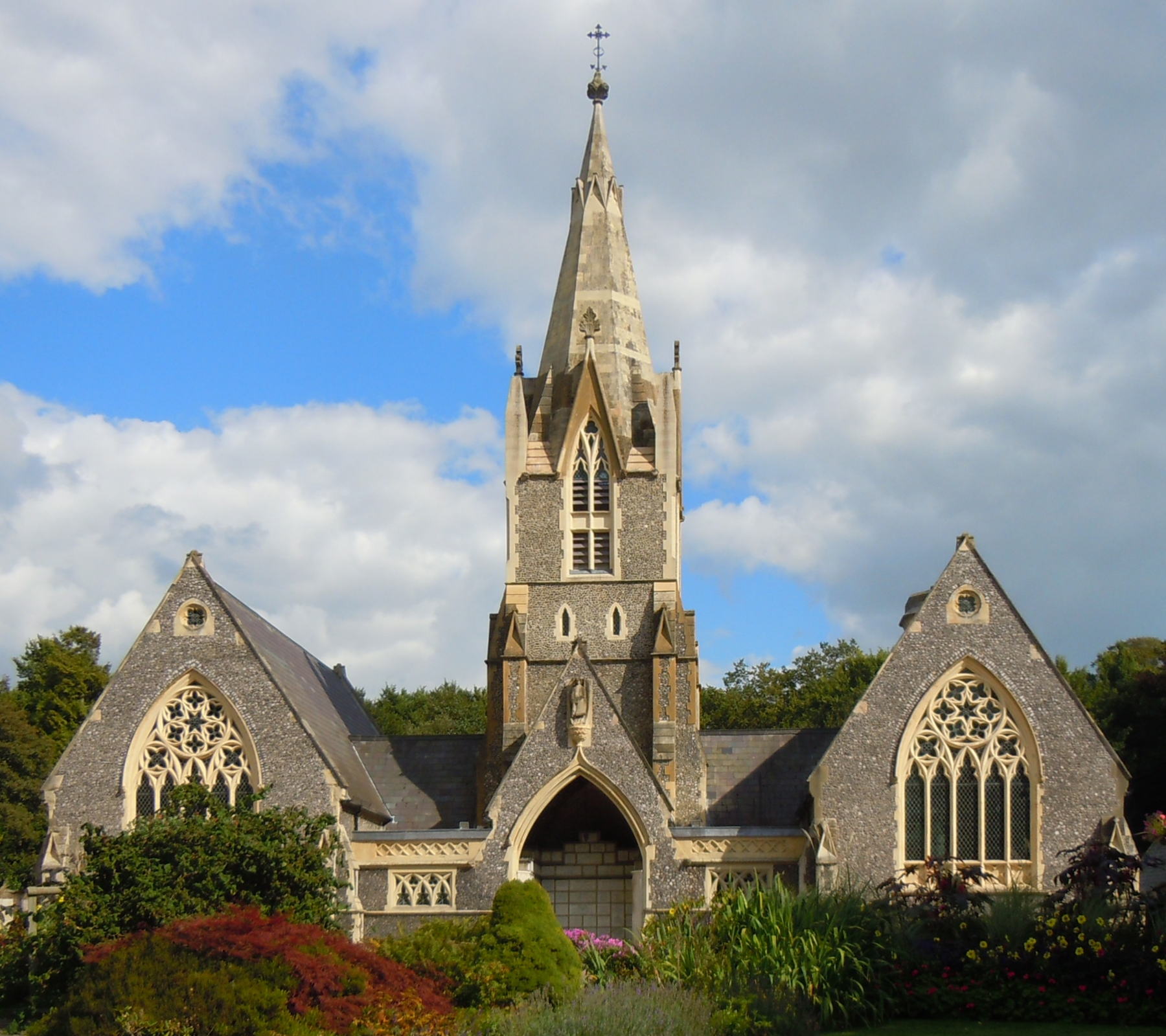
Woodvale Crematorium opened in 1930 in one of the twin chapels of Woodvale Cemetery.

Brighton and Hove City Council owns and operates the Extra Mural, Woodvale and City (Bear Road) Cemeteries in Brighton, the Lawn Memorial Cemetery in Woodingdean, Hove Cemetery, Portslade Cemetery, a Jewish burial ground at Meadowview, and the Woodvale Crematorium in Brighton. All are open to the public every day of the year; opening hours vary between summer and winter. One other cemetery is privately owned, and the same company owns and runs a second crematorium. Buildings on the approach road to Woodvale Cemetery house the council's Bereavement Services division and the Brighton and Hove City Mortuary, from where the council's coroner and mortuary staff operate.

Following the passing of the Public Health Act 1848, a government health inspector visited Brighton to make a report on the town's sanitary conditions. Among other recommendations, he advised that burials at churches and chapels should cease. In 1850, prominent Brighton residents Amon Henry Wilds, John Cordy Burrows, Rev. John Nelson Goulty and his son Horatio Nelson Goulty formed the Brighton Extra Mural Company with the intention of creating a private cemetery. The Extra Mural Cemetery opened in November 1851, covering 13 acres (5.3 ha) east of the Lewes Road. It was extended by a further 8 acres (3.2 ha) six years later. In the same year, the Brighton Parochial Cemetery (now the Woodvale Cemetery) was laid out on 20 acres (8.1 ha) of land belonging to Frederick Hervey, 1st Marquess of Bristol immediately adjacent to the Extra Mural Cemetery. This cemetery was not taken over by Brighton Borough Council until 1902. Immediately to the north of the Extra Mural Cemetery, separated from it by Bear Road, the Brighton Borough Cemetery—now the city (Bear Road) Cemetery—opened on a 31.5-acre (12.7 ha) site in 1868. The council opened the Lawn Memorial Cemetery on 9.5 acres (3.8 ha) of open downland at Woodingdean in January 1963; it has since been extended to 36.5 acres (14.8 ha). A 3.5-acre (1.4 ha) section was enclosed in 1919 to form the Meadowview Jewish Cemetery. It was extended to 5 acres (2.0 ha) in 1978 and is managed by the city council. The Hove Commissioners, forerunners of Hove Borough Council, bought 20 acres (8.1 ha) of land south of Old Shoreham Road in Aldrington parish in 1879 and laid out Hove Cemetery from 1880. Another 20.8 acres (8.4 ha) north of the road was bought and laid out in 1923. Portslade's municipal cemetery was opened in 1872. It covered 4 acres (1.6 ha) at first; an extension opened in 1896. The Brighton Borough Crematorium, the first in Sussex, opened in 1930 at Woodvale Cemetery: it was adapted from one of the cemetery chapels. It is now called Woodvale Crematorium and is still council-run.

== Bibliography ==
- Antram, Nicholas; Morrice, Richard (2008). Brighton and Hove. Pevsner Architectural Guides. London: Yale University Press. ISBN 978-0-300-12661-7.
- Berry, Sue (2002). "Myth and Reality in the Representation of Resorts: Brighton and the Emergence of the "Prince and Fishing Village" Myth 1770–1824". Sussex Archaeological Collections. 140. Lewes: Sussex Archaeological Society: 97–112. doi:10.5284/1086047.
- Brighton Polytechnic. School of Architecture and Interior Design (1987). A Guide to the Buildings of Brighton. Macclesfield: McMillan Martin. ISBN 1-869-86503-0.
- Carder, Timothy (1990). The Encyclopaedia of Brighton. Lewes: East Sussex County Libraries. ISBN 0-86147-315-9.
- Collis, Rose (2010). The New Encyclopaedia of Brighton. (based on the original by Tim Carder) (1st ed.). Brighton: Brighton & Hove Libraries. ISBN 978-0-9564664-0-2.
- D'Enno, Douglas (2007). Brighton Crime & Vice 1800–2000. Barnsley: Wharncliffe Books. ISBN 978-1-845630-30-0.
- Dale, Antony (1950). The History and Architecture of Brighton. Brighton: Bredin & Heginbothom Ltd.
- Dale, Antony (1991). Brighton Cemeteries. Brighton: Brighton Borough Council.
- Farrant, Sue (1985). Changes in Brighton and Hove's Suburbs: Preston and Patcham 1841–1871. Hove: Dr S. Farrant. ISBN 0-9510225-0-4.
- Gilbert, Edmund M. (1975) [1954]. Brighton: Old Ocean's Bauble. Hassocks: Flare Books. ISBN 0-901759-39-2.
- Middleton, Judy (2002). The Encyclopaedia of Hove & Portslade. Brighton: Brighton & Hove Libraries.
- Musgrave, Clifford (1981). Life in Brighton. Rochester: Rochester Press. ISBN 0-571-09285-3.
- s.n. (August 2020). Drainage and Wastewater Management Plan (DWMP): Adur and Ouse River Catchments (PDF) (Report) (Draft ed.). Southern Water. Archived (PDF) from the original on 19 August 2022.
- Various authors (2004). Rose Hill to Roundhill: a Brighton Community. Brighton: Brighton Books Publishing. ISBN 1-901454-08-8.
