= Southern Water =

Water utility company in southern England

Southern Water Services Limited

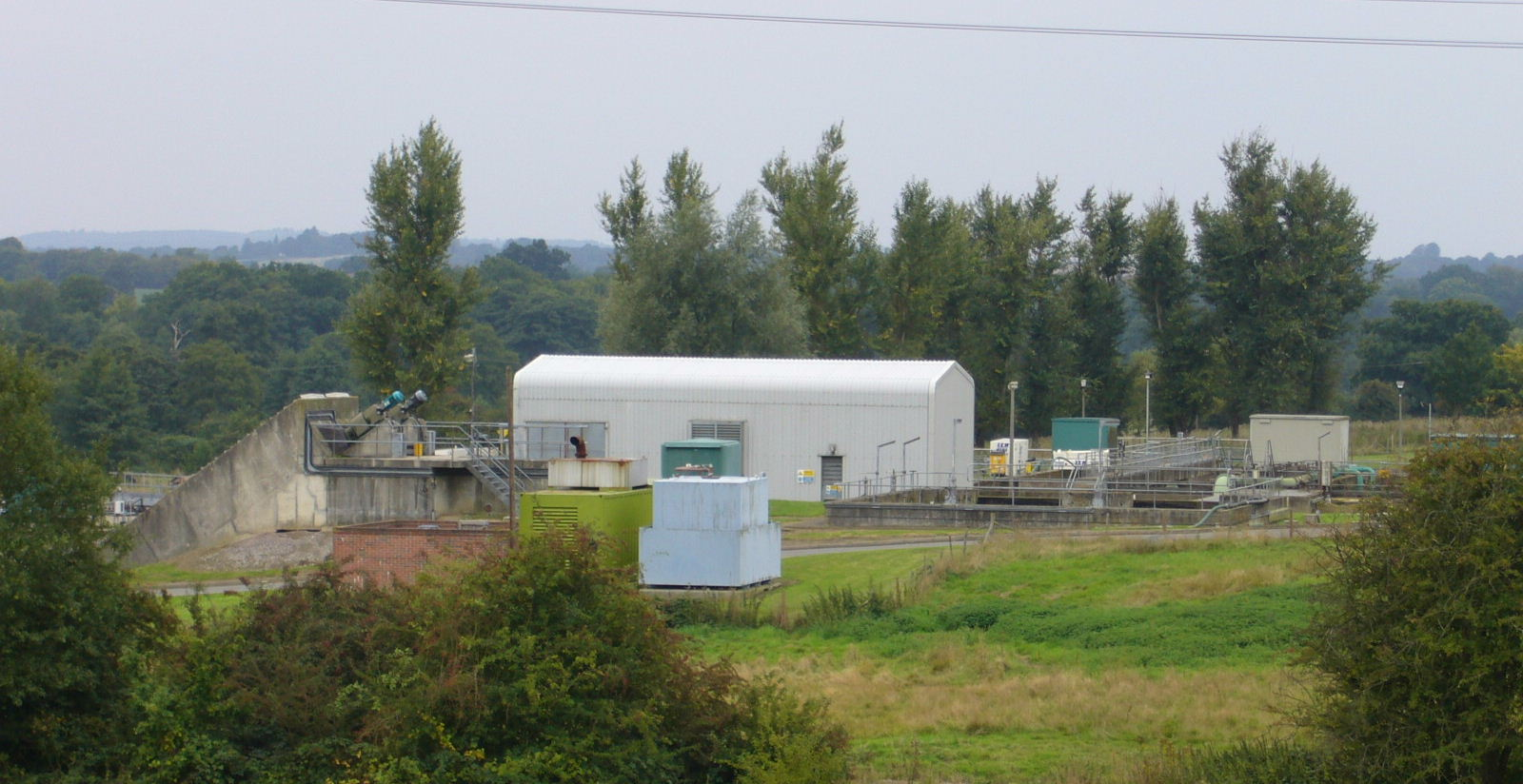
- Tunbridge Wells South Wastewater Treatment Works
- Type: Subsidiary
- Industry: Water industry
- Founded: 1 April 1989; 37 years ago
- Headquarters: Worthing, West Sussex, England
- Area served: East Sussex; Kent; Hampshire; Isle of Wight; West Sussex
- Key people: Keith Lough (Chairman); Lawrence Gosden (CEO)
- Products: Drinking water; Recycled wastewater
- Production output: 0.529 Gl/day (drinking); 0.730 Gl/day (recycled)
- Services: Water supply; Sewage treatment
- Revenue: ▲£0.829 billion (2017–18); £0.809 billion (2016–17)
- Number of employees: 2,092
- Parent: Macquarie Group
- Website: www.southernwater.co.uk

Southern Water Services Limited, trading as Southern Water, is the private utility company responsible for the public wastewater collection and treatment in Hampshire, the Isle of Wight, West Sussex, East Sussex and Kent, and for the public water supply and distribution in approximately half of this area. Some areas within the Southern Water region are supplied by a number of smaller water supply companies. Southern Water supplies an area totalling 4,450 sq. km. and serves 2.26 million customers.

Southern Water is regulated under the Water Industry Act 1991 and since 2021 has been majority-owned by Macquarie Group.

In June 2019, Ofwat proposed a fine of £126 million as a result of Southern Water's failures to operate its wastewater treatment works properly and deliberately misreporting its performance. Ofwat found that failings had resulted in unpermitted and premature spills of wastewater from treatment works, with wastewater being released into the environment before going through the required processes.

In 2020, Southern Water pleaded guilty to 51 offences related to discharging untreated sewage into the sea, and was fined £90m.

== History ==
=== Origins ===
The Water Act 1973 resulted in the formation of the Southern Water Authority (SWA), taking the responsibility away from the local authorities. Nevertheless, the SWA maintained a regional management approach, retaining three separate regional headquarters:

- Otterbourne near Winchester, covering Hampshire and the Isle of Wight
- Falmer near Brighton, covering East Sussex and West Sussex
- Chatham, covering Kent.

The authority took over the assets and duties of the following water undertakings:

- Hampshire River Authority
- Sussex River Authority
- Kent River Authority (Note: Except the area draining into the Thames above Greenhithe.)
- Brighton Corporation
- Hastings Corporation
- Southampton Corporation
- Tunbridge Wells Corporation
- Winchester Corporation
- Worthing Corporation
- Isle of Wight River and Water Authority
- Medway Water Board
- North West Sussex Water Board
- Thanet Water Board

A number of private statutory water companies existed within the water authority's area. These continued to exist, and in their supply areas, the water authority provided sewerage services only:

- Eastbourne Waterworks Company
- Folkestone and District Water Company
- Mid Kent Water Company
- Mid-Sussex Water Company
- Portsmouth Water Company
- Sevenoaks and Tonbridge Water Company

==== Predecessors ====
===== Brighton Corporation Waterworks =====
Brighton Corporation Waterworks was formed by the Brighton Corporation Waterworks Act 1872 (35 & 36 Vict. c. lxxxvi), taking over the Brighton, Hove, and Preston (Constant Service) Waterworks Company.

The Brighton, Hove and Preston Constant Service Waterworks Company was founded by the Brighton, Hove and Preston Constant Service Act 1853 (16 & 17 Vict. c. xxv), and the following year bought the Brighton, Hove and Preston Waterworks Company by the Brighton, Hove and Preston Constant Service Waterworks Act 1854 (17 & 18 Vict. c. v).

The Brighton, Hove and Preston Waterworks Company was founded by the Brighthelmston, Hove and Preston Water Act 1834 (4 & 5 Will. 4. c. lxii).

===== Southampton Corporation Waterworks =====
Southampton Corporation took over the South Hants Waterworks Company under the Southampton Corporation Water Act 1921 (11 & 12 Geo. 5. c. lxxix).

The Southampton Water Supply Act 1746 (20 Geo. 2. c. 15) created the Southampton Waterworks Commissioners.

The undertaking of the Southampton Water Commissioners was transferred to Southampton Corporation by a provisional order confirmed by the Public Health Supplemental Act 1850 (No. 3) (13 & 14 Vict. c. 108).

The South Hants Waterworks Company was incorporated by the South Hants Water Act 1876 (39 & 40 Vict. c. clxxxvii).

The South Hants Waterworks Company took over the Bishop's Waltham Waterworks Company by the Bishop's Waltham Water Act 1913 (3 & 4 Geo. 5. c. xix), which had been authorised to supply water by the Bishop's Waltham Water Order 1894.

===== Tunbridge Wells Corporation Waterworks =====
The Tunbridge Wells Improvement Act 1835 (5 & 6 Will. 4. c. lxxii) gave the Tunbridge Wells Improvement Commissioners power to arrange a supply of water for the town, and they established a waterworks.

The improvement commissioners became the Tunbridge Wells Local Board of Health in 1860, and by the Tunbridge Wells Water Act 1865 (28 & 29 Vict. c. cciv) they took over the private Calverley Waterworks Company and Tunbridge Wells Water Company. Tunbridge Wells became a municipal borough in 1889, and Tunbridge Wells Corporation were then responsible for the waterworks.

Under the Kent Water Act 1955 (4 & 5 Eliz. 2. c. xi) it took over the water undertakings of Southborough Urban District Council and Tonbridge Rural District Council.

===== Isle of Wight River and Water Authority =====
The Isle of Wight River and Water Authority was formed by the Isle of Wight River and Water Authority Act 1964 (c. xxv). It took over the water supply undertaking from the Isle of Wight Water Board.

The Isle of Wight Water Board was constituted by the Isle of Wight Water Board Order 1950 (SI 1950/2009).

===== Medway Water Board =====
The Medway Water Board was created by the Kent Water Act 1955 (4 & 5 Eliz. 2. c. xi). It took over the Chatham and District Water Company, the Gravesend and Milton Waterworks Company, the Higham and Hundred of Hoo Water Company, and Rochester Corporation Waterworks. It supplied Chatham, Gillingham, Gravesend, Queenborough-in-Sheppey, Rochester, Northfleet, Sittingbourne and Milton, Hollingbourn, Malling, Strood and Swale.

===== North West Sussex Water Board =====
The North West Sussex Water Board was constituted by the North West Sussex Water Order 1959 (SI 1959/552).

===== Thanet Water Board =====
The Thanet Water Board was created by the Kent Water Act 1955 (4 & 5 Eliz. 2. c. xi) from Margate Corporation Waterworks, Ramsgate Corporation Waterworks, and Sandwich Corporation Waterworks, as well as the water undertakings of the urban districts of Broadstairs and St. Peter's and the rural district of Eastry. It also took over the Westgate and Birchington Water Company and part of the undertaking of the Mid Kent Water Company.

=== Privatisation ===
In 1989 the ten publicly owned water and sewerage authorities were privatised. This was achieved by transferring the water supply and sewerage assets, and the relevant staff, of the Southern Water Authority into the limited company Southern Water Services Ltd. Privatisation was accompanied by the raising of capital by floating parent companies on the London Stock Exchange, a one-off injection of public capital, the write off of significant government debt, and the provision of capital tax allowances.

=== Takeovers ===
In 1996 Southern Water was purchased in a hostile takeover bid by Scottish Power. Southern Water assets were considerably impacted during the period under Scottish Power. During this period, the bulk of in-house scientific laboratory services and assets were shut down, dismantled and sold off. In 2002, Scottish Power sold the company to First Aqua Limited.

In October 2007, the company was bought by Greensands Holdings Limited, a consortium of investors representing infrastructure investment funds, pension funds and private equity. By 2019, the largest shareholders are JP Morgan Asset Management (40%), UBS Asset Management (22%), Hermes Infrastructure Funds (21%) and Whitehelm Capital (8%).

In August 2021, Australian financial services company Macquarie Group bought a majority stake in the company.

=== Price review 2024 ===
In July 2024, the water regulator Ofwat published its draft determination of water prices for Southern Water from 2025-2030. It determined the company could increase prices by 44% by 2030. In February 2025, it was announced that the company had rejected Ofwat's final determination and that it would submit an appeal with the Competition and Markets Authority.

== Activities ==
The company supplies drinking water to roughly 1.1 million properties through its 91 water treatment works and 13,870 kilometres of water mains. Wastewater is treated by the company's network of 365 wastewater treatment works and 39,594 kilometres of sewers.

Southern Water has also opened up some of their activities to the public. This includes the company running guided tours of the Victorian sewers of Brighton and Hove and public access to Bewl Water, one of the largest reservoirs in England. The historic Twyford Waterworks near Winchester is leased to the Twyford Waterworks Trust, who open it on selected days during the year.

In September 2024 the Financial Times reported that Southern Water was in talks to tanker-in water supplies from Norwegian fjords.

== Performance ==
=== Legal issues ===
==== 2005–2007 ====
In 2007, Ofwat announced its intention to fine Southern Water £20.3 million for 'deliberate misreporting' and failing to meet guaranteed standards of service to customers. The misreporting resulted in Southern Water being able to raise its prices by more than it should have done. Southern Water Chief Executive Les Dawson said: "Today's announcement draws a line under a shameful period in the company's history" and "we accept this fine - we have no arguments with it".

==== 2009–2011 ====
Crawley Magistrates' Court heard that the Environment Agency received calls from members of the public after dead fish were seen in the Sunnyside Stream in East Grinstead on 30 August 2009. The court also heard that a similar incident occurred along the same sewer line some 4 years earlier in September 2005. Following an investigation, in June 2010 Southern Water was fined £3,000 after it admitted polluting 2 km of the Sussex stream with raw sewage, killing up to a hundred brown trout and devastating the fish population for the second time in five years.

In 2011 Southern Water Ltd was fined £25,000 when sewage flooded into Southampton water.

The company was ordered to pay £10,000 in fines and costs after sewage seeped into a stream at Beltinge in Kent.

A leak of sewage from Southern Water's plant at Hurstpierpoint pumping station, West Sussex, lead to fines and costs of £7,200 in 2011.

Southern Water was fined £50,000 in April 2011 for two offences relating to unscreened discharges into Langstone Harbour, Hampshire, between November 2009 and April 2010.

==== 2014–2016 ====
In November 2014 Southern Water were fined £500,000 and agreed to pay costs of £19,224 at Canterbury Crown Court after an Environment Agency investigation found that untreated sewage was discharged into the Swalecliffe Brook, polluting a 1.2 km stretch of the watercourse and killing local wildlife. Although sewage directly polluted a 1.2 km stretch, the Swalecliffe Brook flows through the Thanet Coast Site of Special Scientific Interest (SSSI) before it joins the north Kent coast to the east of Whitstable.

In December 2016 Southern Water was fined a record £2,000,000 for flooding beaches in Kent with raw sewage. As a result of a series of failures at a wastewater pumping station, raw sewage flooded on to beaches, forcing Thanet district council to close the beaches to the public for nine days including during the Queen's Diamond Jubilee bank holiday weekend. The Environment Agency called the event “catastrophic”, with tampons, condoms and other debris costing more than £400,000 to clean up. The Environment Agency said that the discharge along a considerable length of coastline, resulted in a risk to public health and negative impact in an area heavily reliant on the tourism industry. A judge at Maidstone Crown Court said that Southern Water's repeat offending was “wholly unacceptable”. Following the investigation, Southern Water director Simon Oates apologised unreservedly for the failure of the wastewater plant.

==== 2019 ====
In June 2019, the Water Services Regulation Authority (Ofwat) announced its intentions to issue Southern Water with a financial penalty of £37.7 million reduced exceptionally to £3 million for significant breaches of its licence conditions and statutory duties.

Following a lengthy investigation, Ofwat concluded that Southern Water deliberately misreported data about the performance of its wastewater treatment works. The investigation concluded that Southern Water had failed: to have adequate systems of planning, governance and internal controls in place to manage its wastewater treatment works; to accurately report information about the performance of these works; and to properly carry out its statutory duties as a sewerage undertaker, to make provision for effectually dealing with and treating wastewater. Ofwat found that Southern Water's failure to operate its wastewater treatment works properly resulted in unpermitted and premature spills of wastewater from its treatment works, with wastewater being released into the environment before going through the required processes. Following the investigation, Southern Water agreed to pay customers approximately £123 million by 2024, partly a payment of price review underperformance penalties the company avoided paying in the period 2010 to 2017 and some of which is a payment to customers for the failures found in Ofwat's investigation. In response to Ofwat's findings, Southern Water announced that following its own internal review, which highlighted multiple failures between 2010 and 2017, it was "profoundly sorry" and "working very hard to understand past failings and implement the changes required" to ensure it meets the standards its customers deserve.

==== 2021 ====
In 2020, Southern Water pleaded guilty to 51 offences related to polluting the water on the coasts of Kent and Sussex with untreated sewage between 1 January 2010 and 31 December 2015. It was described as "the worst case brought by the Environment Agency in its history." Over the period, the company made 8,400 illegal discharges of raw sewage into coastal waters. It also allowed storm tanks to be kept full and turn septic, instead of putting their contents through the required treatment process. In one plant alone, 746m litres were released into Southampton Water. Southern Water failed to report its illegal discharges to the regulator, but as the quality of shellfish on the Kent coast failed to meet quality standards due to the high levels of faecal contamination the Environment Agency began to investigate. The company was fined £90m for deliberately discharging billions of litres of raw sewage into the sea and the judge stated that the offences had been committed deliberately by Southern Water's directors.

===== Payment of the £90 million fine =====
Southern Water said that customers would not have to pay for the £90 million fine.
