= Seeboard =

British electricity supplier (1947–1993)

Seeboard, formerly South Eastern Electricity Board (SEEB), was a British electricity company. The electrical power industry in the United Kingdom was nationalised by the Electricity Act 1947, when over 600 electric power companies were merged into 12 area boards, one of which was the South Eastern Electricity Board. At its closure it served nearly 2 million residential customers.

== History ==
The key people on the board were: Charles George Morley New (d.1957) (1948–55), Chairman Harold V. Pugh (1964), E. Sinnott (1967), Deputy Chairman E. Sinnott (1964), A. G. Milne (1967), full-time member E. Peel (1964, 1967). The board acquired the then Princes Hotel) on the seafront in Hove, East Sussex, and converted it to a headquarters. The building was refurbished and substantially extended between 1979 and 1981.

=== Existing electricity suppliers taken over at nationalisation ===
The Electricity (Allocation of Undertakings to Area Boards) Order 1948 (SI 1948/484) transferred the electricity business of the following local authorities and private companies to the new board effective 31 March 1948.

==== Local authorities ====
- Ashford Urban District Council
- Bexhill Corporation
- Brighton Corporation
- Canterbury Corporation
- Croydon Corporation
- Dover Corporation
- Eastbourne Corporation
- East Grinstead Urban District Council
- Epsom and Ewell Corporation
- Faversham Corporation
- Gillingham Corporation Gravesend Corporation
- Guildford Corporation
- Hastings Corporation
- Horsham Urban District Council
- Hove Corporation
- Kingston-upon-Thames Corporation
- London and Home Counties Joint Electricity Authority
- Maidstone Corporation
- Margate, Broadstairs and District Electricity Board
- Reigate Corporation
- Tonbridge Urban District Council
- Tunbridge Wells Corporation
- Walton and Weybridge Urban District Council
- Worthing Corporation

==== Private companies ====
- Burgess Hill Electricity
- Central Sussex Electricity
- Folkestone Electricity Supply Company
- Guildford Gas Light Coke Company
- Herne Bay District Electricity Supply Company
- Horley District Electricity Supply Company
- Kent Electric Power Company
- Lewes District Electric Supply Company
- Peacehaven Electric Light Power Company
- Ramsgate District Electric Supply Company
- Richmond (Surrey) Electric Light Power Company
- Ringmer and District Electricity Company
- Seaford and Newhaven Electricity
- Sevenoaks and District Electricity Company
- Sheerness and District Electric Supply Company
- Shoreham and District Electric Lighting Power Company
- South-East Kent Electric Power Company
- Steyning Electricity
- Sussex Electricity Supply Company
- Uckfield Gas and Electricity Company
- Weald Electricity Supply Company
- West Kent Electric Company
- Whitstable Electric Company
- Woking Electric Supply Company

== Customer data ==
The total number of customers supplied by the board was:

Customers supplied South Eastern Electricity Board
Year	1948/9	1960/1	1965/6	1970/1	1975/6	1978/9	1980/1	1985/6	1987/8	1988/9
Number of customers, 1000s	1482	1787	1848	1849	1844	1872	1787	1849	1887	1909

Electricity, in GWh, sold by the South Eastern Electricity Board over its operational life

== Privatisation ==
On 31 March 1990 the area electricity boards were changed to independent regional electricity companies (REC), and Seeboard plc was formed. On 11 December 1990 the RECs were privatised. The Hove headquarters was closed in 1994, but some jobs were transferred to a nearby Seeboard office in Portslade.

Seeboard Powerlink, a company owned by Seeboard, BICC and ABB, was awarded (on 13 August 1998) a 30-year contract to operate, maintain, finance and renew London Underground's high-voltage power distribution network, under the terms of the UK government's private finance initiative. Seeboard Powerlink became responsible for distribution of high-voltage electricity supplies to London Underground's substations and more than 400 kilometres (250 miles) of track. The contract included significant capital construction and installation works on the LUL power system valued at approximately £100 million.

In 2002 Seeboard joined 24seven Utility Services under the ownership of the LE Group, which then rebranded in 2003 to become EDF Energy Networks, the UK branch of Électricité de France, before being acquired by Cheung Kong Holdings and renamed UK Power Networks.

== Bibliography ==
- Middleton, Judy (2003). The Encyclopaedia of Hove & Portslade. Brighton: Brighton & Hove Libraries.
