= Kings House, Hove =

Grade II listed building in Hove, England

Coordinates: 50.8246°N 0.1682°W

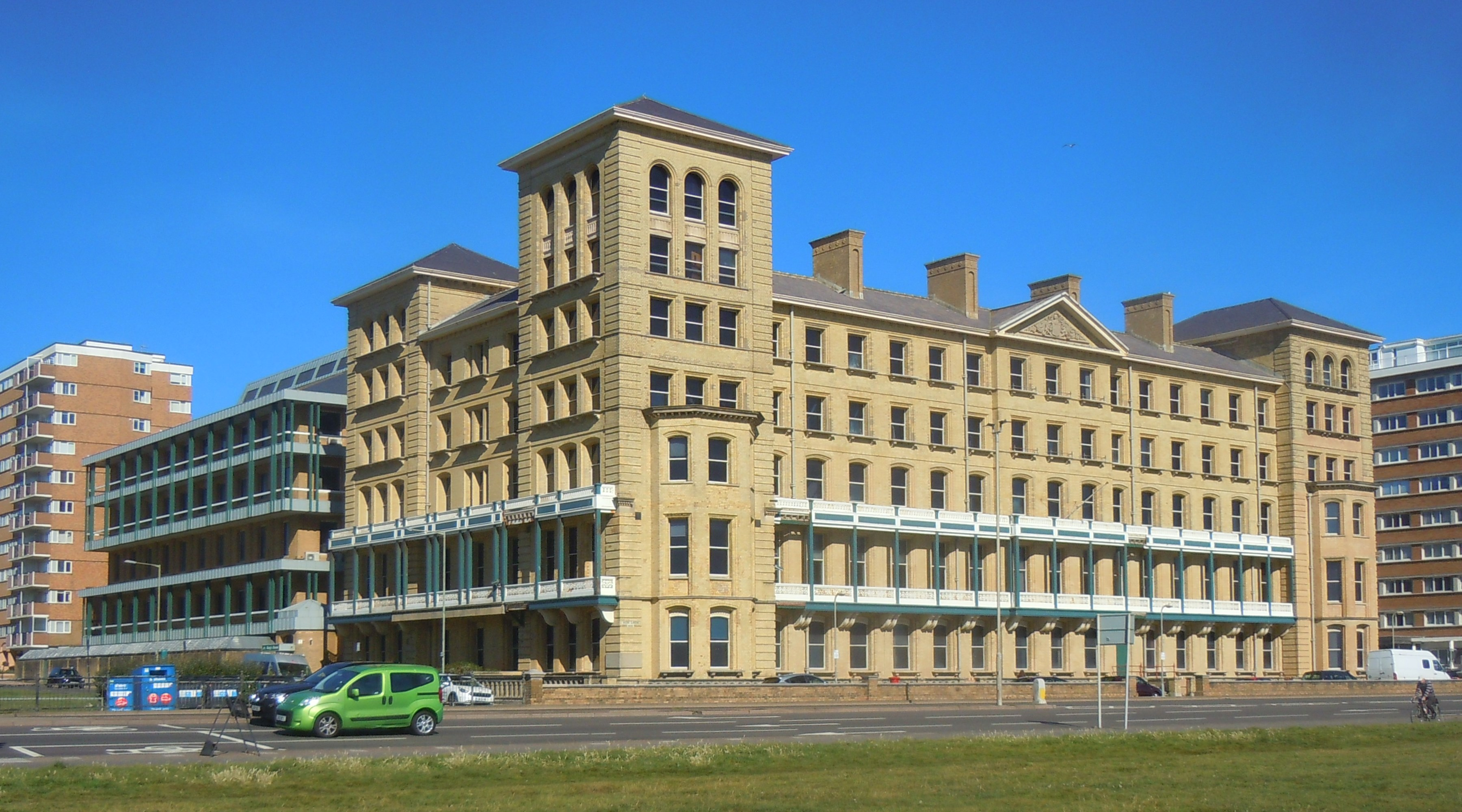
Kings House, Hove in 2018.

Kings House is a Grade II listed building in Hove that was previously used as offices by Brighton and Hove City Council. It is situated in Grand Avenue.

== History ==
Kings House was built between 1871 and 1874 by James Knowles; originally it was built as seven mansion blocks, and was based on the style of Osborne House on the Isle of Wight. It then became a hotel, called the Prince's Hotel, before being used by the Royal Navy during the Second World War. In 1948, the building was bought by SEEBOARD to use as the company headquarters, before being bought by Brighton and Hove City Council in 1996. In 1974, the building became a Grade II listed building.

In July 2014, Kings House was put up for sale for £10 million, as part of a cost saving plan. By 2015, the valuation of the property had increased to around £20 million, with staff being relocated from the building to Hove Town Hall by December 2016. It was sold for £26 million in July 2017 to Mortar Nova Grand Avenue, a joint venture development vehicle between developer Rego Property and Pacific Investments. The buyer plans to turn the building back into housing.

In July 2018, new partners joined the joint venture with the original partners exited. The new partner is a REPE Fund managed by a Hong Kong–based asset management company - Tianli Financial Limited, whereas Rego Property remain as the development manager. In September 2019, the development work kicked started, and it completed in July 2021.
