= Brighton sewers =

Sewer system in Brighton and Hove, England

Coordinates: 50.819°N 0.138°W

Brighton Interceptor Sewer in 1874

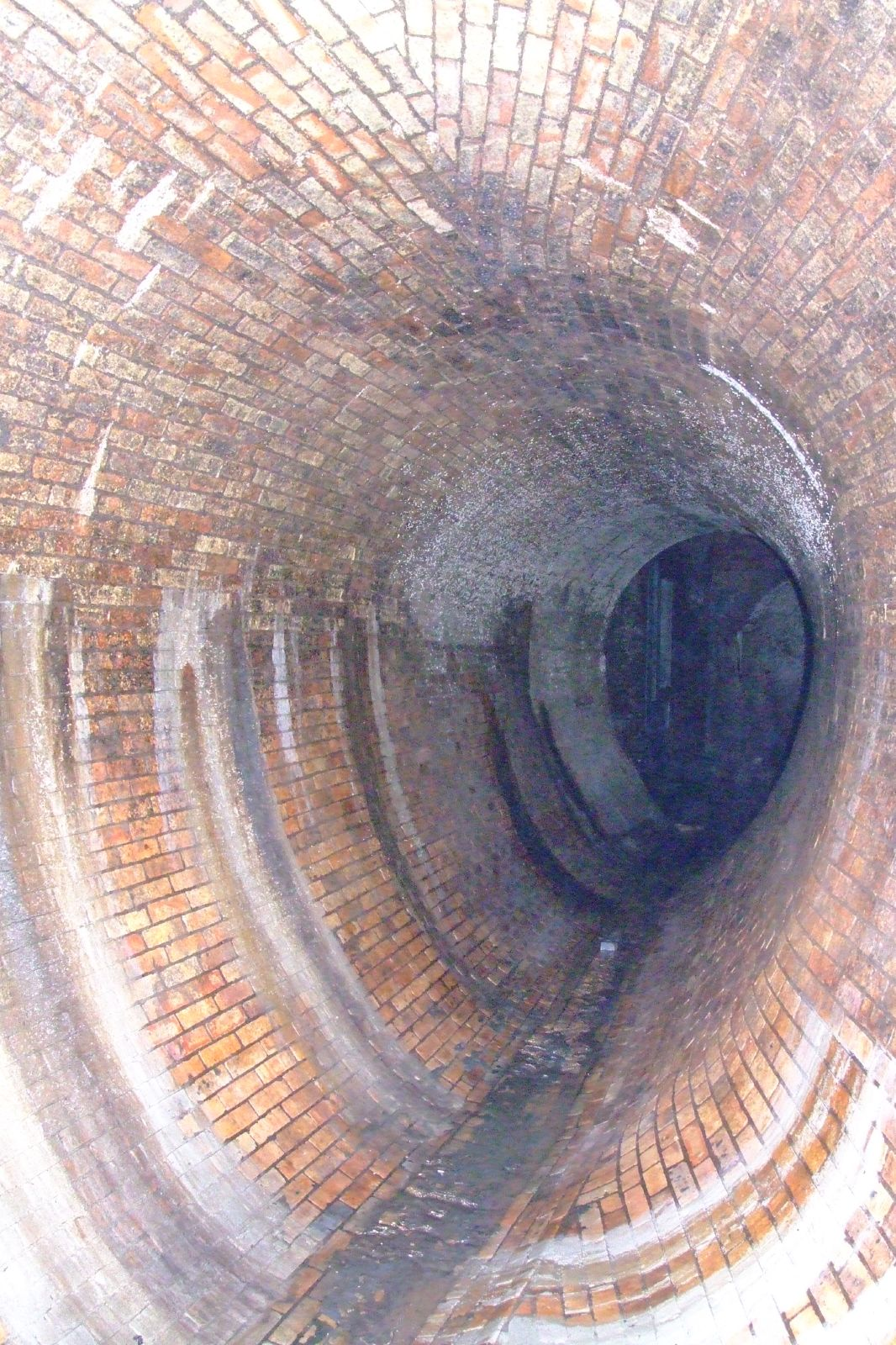
Victorian tunnel of Brighton sewers

The city of Brighton and Hove in England has an extensive system of Victorian sewers running under the town, and a large modern storm drain under the beach.

The system is connected to a number of outfalls at the popular bathing beach, including emergency storm-water outfalls which could still release raw sewage until the 1990s. One of these may be seen in the stone groyne adjacent to the Palace Pier. During the late 1990s a massive storm water collection drain – wide enough to drive a vehicle through – was constructed along the beach, using tunnelling machines similar to those used to cut the Channel Tunnel. These were lowered to the tunnel depth via several deep shafts sunk at intervals along the beach, which were subsequently capped and covered. Pebbles were replaced on top of the shafts to return the beach to its former appearance and public use.

The company responsible for the sewers, Southern Water, runs tours for the public during the summer and Brighton Festival.

== See also ==
- History of Brighton
