= Old Ship Hotel =

Hotel in Brighton, England

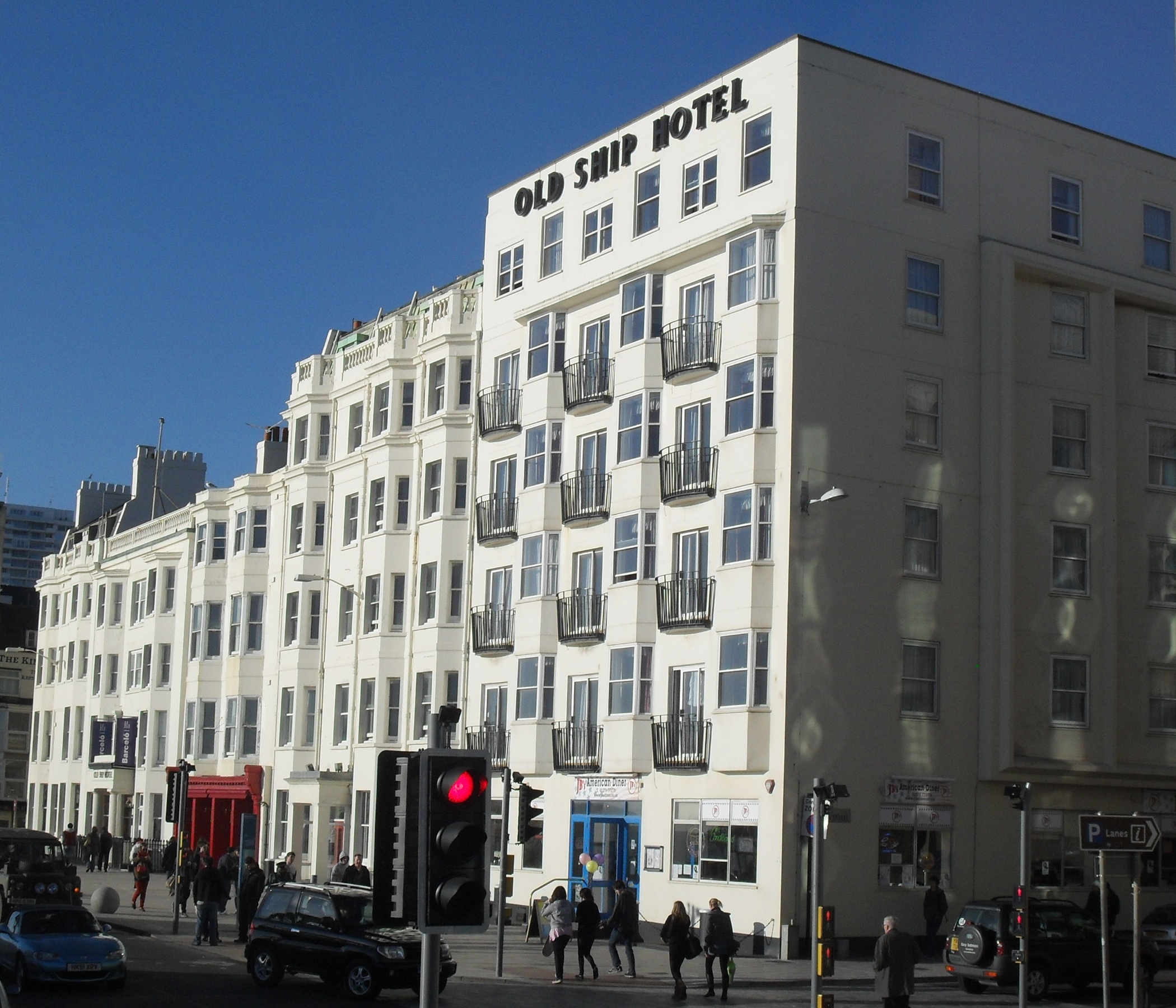
- The Old Ship Hotel in 2010
- Interactive map of the Old Ship Hotel area

General information
- Status: Completed
- Type: Hotel
- Classification: Grade II*
- Location: Brighton, England, Brighton, United Kingdom
- Coordinates: 50°49′13″N 00°08′32″W
- Construction started: 1559

The Old Ship Hotel (also known as the Old Ship Inn and previously as The Ship) (Note: When the New Ship Inn was built nearby in 1650, the inn became known as the Old Ship Inn.) is a hotel in central Brighton, UK, which contains the Old Ship Assembly Rooms, a Grade II* listed building. The building is the oldest hotel in Brighton, as the hotel is believed to have been built in 1559, with the assembly rooms being added in 1767.

== History ==
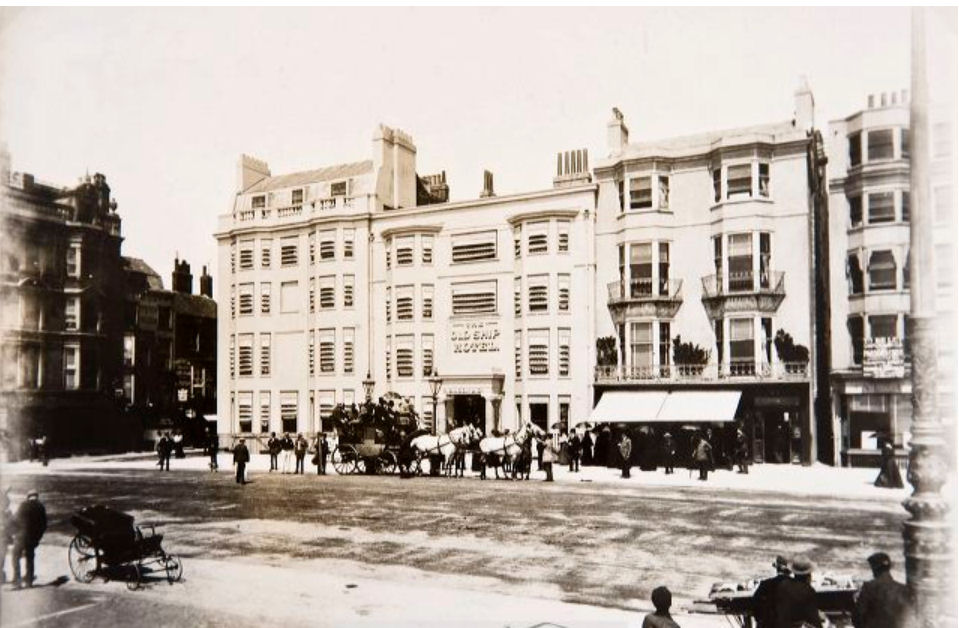
The Old Ship Hotel, c. 1899

The Old Ship Hotel is believed to date from 1559, as an unnamed house owned by Richard and John Gilham. It is the oldest hotel in Brighton, and the first known record was in 1665. The building was purchased in 1671 by Nicholas Tettersell, who owned the boat Charles II used to get to France. The assembly rooms were built in 1767 in response to assembly rooms built at the nearby Castle Inn; the rooms were built by Robert Golden, with the Adam style inspired by Robert Adam. The assembly rooms contained a ballroom on the first floor, which hosted the Prince Regent's Ball, as well as card and tea rooms. Until 1777, the building hosted the town's post office.

In the 18th century, the hotel was visited by Frances Burney and Samuel Johnson; Johnson had an argument with the local priest, Henry Michell. In 1780, the assembly rooms hosted card evenings on Tuesday and Saturday, although the ballroom was later closed in 1814. The building was expanded in 1794, and the Ship Street corner block was added in 1835. In 1821, the magistrates' court was moved to the Old Ship, in 1831, Niccolo Paganini gave a concert in the assembly rooms, and in 1835, Gideon Mantell gave a lecture on geology and organic remains at the Old Ship Hotel. Charles Dickens stayed at the hotel in 1841, and other Victorian visitors to the hotel included Robert Schumann's wife, Sims Reeves, Luigi Lablache, Marietta Alboni, Julius Benedict, Charles Santley, Henry Irving, Herbert Beerbohm Tree, and Henry Howard, 13th Duke of Norfolk.

By 1885, the assembly rooms had been turned into auction rooms. In the 1930s, the Old Ship began accepting homosexual men in one wing of the hotel. The assembly rooms became a Grade II* listed building in 1952.
