= Grade II listed buildings in Brighton and Hove: I–L =

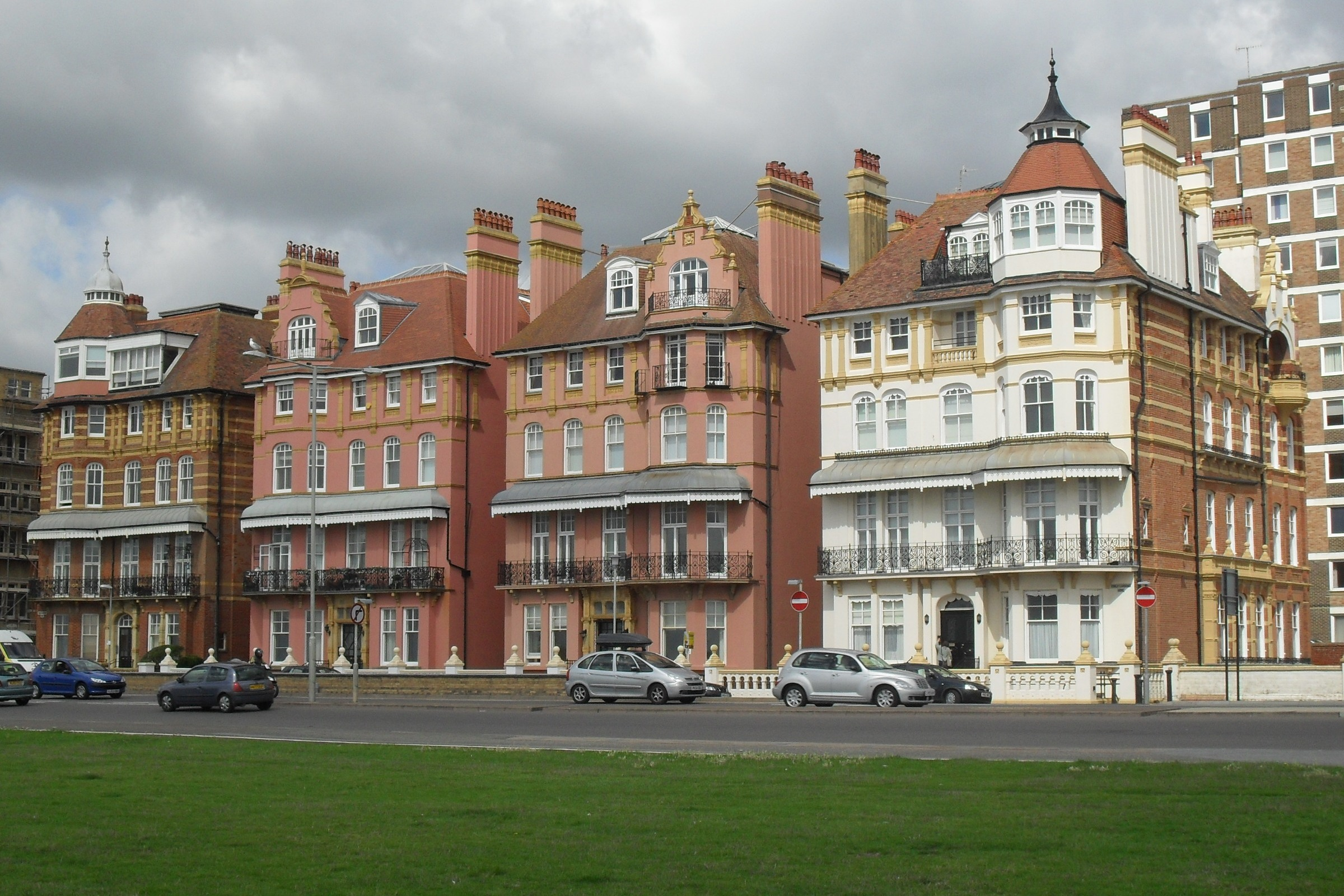
1 to 4 King's Gardens in Hove, built in 1889, are each listed individually at Grade II.

As of February 2001, there were 1,124 listed buildings with Grade II status in the English city of Brighton and Hove. The total at 2009 was similar. The city, on the English Channel coast approximately 52 miles (84 km) south of London, was formed as a unitary authority in 1997 by the merger of the neighbouring towns of Brighton and Hove. Queen Elizabeth II granted city status in 2000.

In England, a building or structure is defined as "listed" when it is placed on a statutory register of buildings of "special architectural or historic interest" by the Secretary of State for Culture, Media and Sport, a Government department, in accordance with the Planning (Listed Buildings and Conservation Areas) Act 1990. English Heritage, a non-departmental public body, acts as an agency of this department to administer the process and advise the department on relevant issues. There are three grades of listing status. The Grade II designation is the lowest, and is used for "nationally important buildings of special interest". Grade II* is used for "particularly important buildings of more than special interest"; there are 69 such buildings in the city. There are also 24 Grade I listed buildings (defined as being of "exceptional interest" and greater than national importance, and the highest of the three grades) in Brighton and Hove.

This list summarises 112 Grade II-listed buildings and structures whose names begin with I, J, K or L. Numbered buildings with no individual name are listed by the name of the street they stand on. Some listings include contributory fixtures such as surrounding walls or railings in front of the building. These are summarised by notes alongside the building name.

== Listed buildings ==
Contributory fixtures
Note	Listing includes
^{[A]}	Attached railings
^{[B]}	Attached walls and railings
^{[C]}	Attached piers and railings
^{[D]}	Attached walls, piers and lamp brackets
^{[E]}	Adjoining wall

Building name	Area	Image	Notes	Refs
Ian Fraser House	Ovingdean; 50.8080°N 0.0684°W		Ian Fraser, Baron Fraser of Lonsdale founded a convalescent home in Brighton in 1918 for war-blinded soldiers. The institute became St Dunstan's, now called Blind Veterans UK. A larger building opened on the cliffs at Ovingdean in 1939; Francis Lorne of the Burnet Tait & Lorne partnership designed it in the International Modern style. Its symmetrical seven-storey orange brick façade resembles a biplane in shape and recalls Charles Holden's contemporary London Underground stations.	
Jaipur Gate	Aldrington; 50.8294°N 0.1811°W		Samuel Swinton Jacob and Thomas Holbein Hendley jointly designed this naqqar khana in 1886 for the Colonial and Indian Exhibition in London. It was presented to the Borough of Hove in 1926 and was installed outside Hove Museum and Art Gallery. An "exotic alien" in this Victorian residential area, it was carved from Indian teak at Shekhawati. Inscriptions in various languages decorate the exterior of the loggia, above which is a central dome.	
Jury's Out (former Thurlow Arms)	Carlton Hill; 50.8225°N 0.1343°W		The Edward Street area degenerated into a slum district in the mid-20th century, but some old buildings survive—such as this pub opposite the law courts. Built in the early 19th century as a house, it was soon converted to its present use. The materials are mathematical tiles, brick and stucco, and decorative features include panelling, Tuscan pilasters and windows of various styles.	
K6 Telephone Kiosk at Bloomsbury Place	East Cliff; 50.8178°N 0.1232°W		This is a telephone kiosk of the standard K6 type developed in 1935 to the design of Giles Gilbert Scott. They are square structures with a slightly dome-shaped roof, made entirely of cast iron with glass panels in the door and walls. This example stands at the south end of Bloomsbury Place and bears the name of the Stirling-based Carron Company foundry.	
K6 Telephone Kiosk at Bloomsbury Place	East Cliff; 50.8178°N 0.1233°W		This is a telephone kiosk of the standard K6 type developed in 1935 to the design of Giles Gilbert Scott. They are square structures with a slightly dome-shaped roof, made entirely of cast iron with glass panels in the door and walls. This example stands at the south end of Bloomsbury Place and bears the name of the Kirkintilloch-based Lion Foundry.	
K6 Telephone Kiosk at Dyke Road	West Hill; 50.8256°N 0.1461°W		This is a telephone kiosk of the standard K6 type developed in 1935 to the design of Giles Gilbert Scott. They are square structures with a slightly dome-shaped roof, made entirely of cast iron with glass panels in the door and walls. This example stands at the junction of Dyke Road and Church Street.	
K6 Telephone Kiosk at Kings Road	Brighton; 50.8228°N 0.1546°W		This is a telephone kiosk of the standard K6 type developed in 1935 to the design of Giles Gilbert Scott. They are square structures with a slightly dome-shaped roof, made entirely of cast iron with glass panels in the door and walls. This example stands at the junction of Kings Road and Bedford Square.	
K6 Telephone Kiosk at Kings Road	Brighton; 50.8227°N 0.1546°W		This is a telephone kiosk of the standard K6 type developed in 1935 to the design of Giles Gilbert Scott. They are square structures with a slightly dome-shaped roof, made entirely of cast iron with glass panels in the door and walls. This example stands at the junction of Kings Road and Bedford Square.	
K6 Telephone Kiosk at New Road	North Laine; 50.8229°N 0.1396°W		This is a telephone kiosk of the standard K6 type developed in 1935 to the design of Giles Gilbert Scott. They are square structures with a slightly dome-shaped roof, made entirely of cast iron with glass panels in the door and walls. This example stands near the Theatre Royal and Pavilion Theatre.	
K6 Telephone Kiosk at New Road	North Laine; 50.8228°N 0.1396°W		This is a telephone kiosk of the standard K6 type developed in 1935 to the design of Giles Gilbert Scott. They are square structures with a slightly dome-shaped roof, made entirely of cast iron with glass panels in the door and walls. This example stands near the Theatre Royal and Pavilion Theatre.	
K6 Telephone Kiosk at Vicarage Lane	Rottingdean; 50.8054°N 0.0581°W		This is a telephone kiosk of the standard K6 type developed in 1935 to the design of Giles Gilbert Scott. They are square structures with a slightly dome-shaped roof, made entirely of cast iron with glass panels in the door and walls. This example stands in the centre of Rottingdean village.	
K6 Telephone Kiosks at Madeira Drive	Brighton; 50.8193°N 0.1362°W		These telephone kiosks are of the standard K6 type developed in 1935 to the design of Giles Gilbert Scott. They are square structures with slightly dome-shaped roofs, made entirely of cast iron with glass panels in the door and walls. They are on the seafront next to the Palace Pier.	
K6 Telephone Kiosks at Pelham Square	North Laine; 50.8280°N 0.1368°W		These telephone kiosks are of the standard K6 type developed in 1935 to the design of Giles Gilbert Scott. They are square structures with slightly dome-shaped roofs, made entirely of cast iron with glass panels in the door and walls. These examples stand in Pelham Square.	
K6 Telephone Kiosks at Powis Square	Montpelier; 50.8276°N 0.1492°W		These telephone kiosks are of the standard K6 type developed in 1935 to the design of Giles Gilbert Scott. They are square structures with slightly dome-shaped roofs, made entirely of cast iron with glass panels in the door and walls. These examples stand at the west end of Powis Square.	
K6 Telephone Kiosks at St Peter's Place	Brighton; 50.8295°N 0.1355°W		These telephone kiosks are of the standard K6 type developed in 1935 to the design of Giles Gilbert Scott. They are square structures with slightly dome-shaped roofs, made entirely of cast iron with glass panels in the door and walls. These examples stand near St Peter's Church in Valley Gardens.	
Karibu and Tabora	Withdean; 50.8536°N 0.1555°W		Originally a single farmhouse dating from 1800, these flint-walled houses are two of the only surviving buildings from the ancient downland hamlet of Withdean—now a postwar residential suburb. The walls also have some brickwork and stucco, and the roofs are tiled.	
Kemp family tomb at St Wulfran's Church	Ovingdean; 50.8156°N 0.0773°W		The Kemp(e) family were prominent in Brighton for many years, and burials in this tomb at St Wulfran's Church include Nathaniel Kemp and the stained glass designer Charles Eamer Kempe, who also designed it. It is a Gothic Revival stone structure bearing the family crest.	
Kemps^{[E]}	Portslade; 50.8435°N 0.2191°W		.	
1–7 Kemp Town Place^{[D]}	Kemp Town; 50.8167°N 0.1135°W		These seven houses form one side of "an attractive, wide mews of cobble-fronted cottages" built between 1824 and 1828 at the same time as the rest of the Kemp Town estate. Each house has two storeys and a slate roof, but the doors and windows are varied in style.	
8–15 Kemp Town Place	Kemp Town; 50.8165°N 0.1136°W		This is the southern section of the mews behind Chichester Terrace, one of the sea-facing parts of the Kemp Town estate. The houses date from the mid-1820s but have been subject to alteration and renewal over the years. The fenestration is varied, and number 13 rises slightly above its neighbours. Number 14 apparently has a window converted from a former loading bay.	
30–37 Kensington Place^{[A]}	North Laine; 50.8280°N 0.1386°W		.	
41–52 Kensington Place^{[A]}	North Laine; 50.8274°N 0.1389°W		.	
Kentfield Billiard Rooms (former)	East Cliff; 50.8205°N 0.1355°W		.	
King and Queen	Brighton; 50.8246°N 0.1371°W		.	
27 King Street	North Laine; 50.8246°N 0.1412°W		.	
1 King's Gardens^{[A]}	Hove; 50.8248°N 0.1700°W		.	
2 King's Gardens^{[A]}	Hove; 50.8248°N 0.1702°W		.	
3 King's Gardens^{[A]}	Hove; 50.8248°N 0.1704°W		.	
4 King's Gardens^{[A]}	Hove; 50.8249°N 0.1706°W		.	
8–14 King's Gardens	Hove; 50.8251°N 0.1718°W		.	
Kings House	Hove; 50.8247°N 0.1685°W		.	
6 Kings Road	Brighton; 50.8199°N 0.1395°W		.	
125 and 126 Kings Road^{[A]}	Brighton; 50.8218°N 0.1498°W		.	
146–148 Kings Road	Brighton; 50.8228°N 0.1551°W		.	
Kiosk opposite West Street	Brighton; 50.8204°N 0.1450°W		.	
Lamp-post at Abbey Road/Great College Street	Kemptown; 50.8191°N 0.1194°W		This cast iron electric light was originally a gas lamp but was later converted to electricity. The design is of the 1880s, but this type of lamp-post was cast between that decade and 1930. From an octagonal socle rises a fluted octagonal pole with a plain capital. Above is a box marked bleeco—the Brighton Lighting and Electrical Engineering Company Ltd—supporting a "swan neck" bracket with a tendril-shaped fitting and a dish-shaped lamp at the end.	
Lamp-post at 10 Arundel Place	Kemptown; 50.8156°N 0.1090°W		This cast iron electric light dates from the late 19th century or later and bears the mark of bleeco—the Brighton Lighting and Electrical Engineering Company Ltd—on its socle. From this rises a fluted pole with a capital and annulet. The upper stage has a "swan neck" shape with a tendril-shaped fitting and a dish-shaped lamp at the end.	
Lamp-post at Chapel Terrace	Kemptown; 50.8184°N 0.1193°W		This mid-19th-century cast iron electric light was originally a gas lamp but was later converted to electricity. The post is styled as a fluted Tuscan column, and tapers as it approaches a cylinder-shaped impost. This supports a box marked bleeco—the Brighton Lighting and Electrical Engineering Company Ltd—above which is a "swan neck" bracket with a tendril-shaped fitting and a dish-shaped lamp at the end.	
Lamp-post at 16 and 17 Charlotte Street	East Cliff; 50.8191°N 0.1281°W		This cast iron electric light dates from the late 19th century or later and bears the mark of bleeco—the Brighton Lighting and Electrical Engineering Company Ltd—on its socle. From this rises a fluted pole with a capital and annulet. The upper stage has a "swan neck" shape with a tendril-shaped fitting and a dish-shaped lamp at the end.	
Lamp-post at Chichester Terrace	Kemp Town; 50.8159°N 0.1129°W		This mid-19th-century cast iron electric light was powered by gas until the early 20th century. The fluted post tapers as it approaches a cylinder-shaped impost. This supports a box marked bleeco—the Brighton Lighting and Electrical Engineering Company Ltd—above which is a "swan neck" bracket with a scroll-shaped fitting and a dish-shaped lamp at the end.	
Lamp-post at College Place	Kemptown; 50.8193°N 0.1222°W		This cast iron electric light dates from the late 19th century or later and bears the mark of bleeco—the Brighton Lighting and Electrical Engineering Company Ltd—on its socle. From this rises a fluted pole with a capital and annulet. The upper stage has a "swan neck" shape with a tendril-shaped fitting and a dish-shaped lamp at the end.	
Lamp-post at Devonshire Place	East Cliff; 50.8211°N 0.1312°W		This cast iron electric light was originally a gas lamp but was later converted to electricity. The design is of the 1880s, but this type of lamp-post was cast between that decade and 1930. From an octagonal socle rises a fluted octagonal pole with a plain capital. Above is a box marked bleeco—the Brighton Lighting and Electrical Engineering Company Ltd—supporting a "swan neck" bracket with a tendril-shaped fitting and a dish-shaped lamp at the end.	
Lamp-post at 1 Eastern Terrace	East Cliff; 50.8173°N 0.1193°W		This cast iron electric light dates from the late 19th century or later and bears the mark of bleeco—the Brighton Lighting and Electrical Engineering Company Ltd—on its socle. From this rises a fluted pole with a capital and annulet. The upper stage has a "swan neck" shape with a tendril-shaped fitting and a dish-shaped lamp at the end.	
Lamp-post at Freshfield Place	Kemptown; 50.8231°N 0.1267°W		This cast iron electric light was originally a gas lamp but was later converted to electricity. The design is of the 1880s, but this type of lamp-post was cast between that decade and 1930. From an octagonal socle rises a fluted octagonal pole with a plain capital. Above is a box marked bleeco—the Brighton Lighting and Electrical Engineering Company Ltd—supporting a "swan neck" bracket with a tendril-shaped fitting and a dish-shaped lamp at the end.	
Lamp-post at 26 Great College Street	Kemptown; 50.8194°N 0.1208°W		This mid-19th-century cast iron electric light was originally a gas lamp but was later converted to electricity. The post is styled as a fluted Tuscan column, and tapers as it approaches a cylinder-shaped impost. This supports a box marked bleeco—the Brighton Lighting and Electrical Engineering Company Ltd—above which is a "swan neck" bracket with a tendril-shaped fitting and a dish-shaped lamp at the end.	
Lamp-post at 43–45 Great College Street	Kemptown; 50.8193°N 0.1201°W		This cast iron electric light was originally a gas lamp but was later converted to electricity. The design is of the 1880s, but this type of lamp-post was cast between that decade and 1930. From an octagonal socle rises a fluted octagonal pole with a plain capital. Above is a box marked bleeco—the Brighton Lighting and Electrical Engineering Company Ltd—supporting a "swan neck" bracket with a tendril-shaped fitting and a dish-shaped lamp at the end.	
Lamp-post at Jewish Cemetery	Round Hill; 50.8389°N 0.1327°W		This was installed in about 1890. The post is fluted, and the light fitting is on the end of a "swan neck"-shaped fitting.	
Lamp-post at 18 Lewes Crescent	Kemp Town; 50.8159°N 0.1101°W		This mid-19th-century cast iron electric light was powered by gas until the early 20th century. The fluted post tapers as it approaches a cylinder-shaped impost. This supports a box marked bleeco—the Brighton Lighting and Electrical Engineering Company Ltd—above which is a "swan neck" bracket with a scroll-shaped fitting and a dish-shaped lamp at the end.	
Lamp-post at 51 Old London Road	Patcham; 50.8637°N 0.1510°W		This cast iron electric light dates from the late 19th century or later and bears the mark of bleeco—the Brighton Lighting and Electrical Engineering Company Ltd—on its socle. From this rises a fluted pole with a capital and annulet. The upper stage has a "swan neck" shape with a tendril-shaped fitting and a dish-shaped lamp at the end.	
Lamp-post at 57 Old London Road	Patcham; 50.8642°N 0.1516°W		This cast iron electric light dates from the late 19th century or later and bears the mark of bleeco—the Brighton Lighting and Electrical Engineering Company Ltd—on its socle. From this rises a fluted pole with a capital and annulet. The upper stage has a "swan neck" shape with a tendril-shaped fitting and a dish-shaped lamp at the end.	
Lamp-post at 21 Park Street	Queen's Park; 50.8225°N 0.1273°W		This cast iron electric light was originally a gas lamp but was later converted to electricity. The design is of the 1880s, but this type of lamp-post was cast between that decade and 1930. From an octagonal socle rises a fluted octagonal pole with a plain capital. Above is a box marked bleeco—the Brighton Lighting and Electrical Engineering Company Ltd—supporting a "swan neck" bracket with a tendril-shaped fitting and a dish-shaped lamp at the end.	
Lamp-post at 29 Park Street	Queen's Park; 50.8228°N 0.1272°W		This cast iron electric light was originally a gas lamp but was later converted to electricity. The design is of the 1880s, but this type of lamp-post was cast between that decade and 1930. From an octagonal socle rises a fluted octagonal pole with a plain capital. Above is a box marked bleeco—the Brighton Lighting and Electrical Engineering Company Ltd—supporting a "swan neck" bracket with a tendril-shaped fitting and a dish-shaped lamp at the end.	
Lamp-post at Park Street/Eastern Road	Queen's Park; 50.8218°N 0.1280°W		This cast iron gas lamp (now electric) has a late-19th-century design. Thin horizontal mouldings decorate the socle, which starts square and becomes octagonal. Above the capital is a box bearing the mark of bleeco—the Brighton Lighting and Electrical Engineering Company Ltd. The upper stage has a "swan neck" shape with a tendril-shaped fitting and a dish-shaped lamp at the end.	
Lamp-post at Preston Manor	Preston Village; 50.8427°N 0.1496°W		This dates from the late 19th century and is near the entrances to Preston Manor and the ancient St Peter's Church. A fluted post rises from a square base with the inscription hardy & radmore / makers / worcester. Above the foliage capital, the "swan neck"-shaped bracket supporting the lamp is not original.	
Lamp-post at 8 Queen's Park Rise	Queen's Park; 50.8264°N 0.1213°W		This mid-19th-century cast iron electric light was originally a gas lamp but was later converted to electricity. The post is styled as a fluted Tuscan column, and tapers as it approaches a cylinder-shaped impost. This supports a box marked bleeco—the Brighton Lighting and Electrical Engineering Company Ltd—above which is a "swan neck" bracket with a tendril-shaped fitting and a dish-shaped lamp at the end.	
Lamp-post at 28 Queen's Park Rise	Queen's Park; 50.8268°N 0.1209°W		This mid-19th-century cast iron electric light was originally a gas lamp but was later converted to electricity. The post is styled as a fluted Tuscan column, and tapers as it approaches a cylinder-shaped impost. This supports a box marked bleeco—the Brighton Lighting and Electrical Engineering Company Ltd—above which is a "swan neck" bracket with a tendril-shaped fitting and a dish-shaped lamp at the end.	
Lamp-post at 5 Queen's Park Terrace	Queen's Park; 50.8272°N 0.1233°W		This cast iron electric light dates from the late 19th century or later and bears the mark of bleeco—the Brighton Lighting and Electrical Engineering Company Ltd—on its socle. From this rises a fluted pole with a capital and annulet. The upper stage has a "swan neck" shape with a tendril-shaped fitting and a dish-shaped lamp at the end.	
Lamp-post at 10 Queen's Park Terrace	Queen's Park; 50.8270°N 0.1229°W		This cast iron electric light dates from the late 19th century or later and bears the mark of bleeco—the Brighton Lighting and Electrical Engineering Company Ltd—on its socle. From this rises a fluted pole with a capital and annulet. The upper stage has a "swan neck" shape with a tendril-shaped fitting and a dish-shaped lamp at the end.	
Lamp-post at 19 Queen's Park Terrace	Queen's Park; 50.8270°N 0.1224°W		This cast iron electric light dates from the late 19th century or later and bears the mark of bleeco—the Brighton Lighting and Electrical Engineering Company Ltd—on its socle. From this rises a fluted pole with a capital and annulet. The upper stage has a "swan neck" shape with a tendril-shaped fitting and a dish-shaped lamp at the end.	
Lamp-post at 38 Queen's Park Terrace	Queen's Park; 50.8267°N 0.1222°W		This cast iron electric light dates from the late 19th century or later and bears the mark of bleeco—the Brighton Lighting and Electrical Engineering Company Ltd—on its socle. From this rises a fluted pole with a capital and annulet. The upper stage has a "swan neck" shape with a tendril-shaped fitting and a dish-shaped lamp at the end.	
Lamp-post at Rock Street	Kemptown; 50.8166°N 0.1122°W		This cast iron electric light dates from the late 19th century or later and bears the mark of bleeco—the Brighton Lighting and Electrical Engineering Company Ltd—on its socle. From this rises a fluted pole with a capital and annulet. The upper stage has a "swan neck" shape with a tendril-shaped fitting and a dish-shaped lamp at the end.	
Lamp-post at 1 and 2 St James's Place	Kemptown; 50.8213°N 0.1356°W		This cast iron electric light was originally a gas lamp but was later converted to electricity. The design is of the 1880s, but this type of lamp-post was cast between that decade and 1930. From an octagonal socle rises a fluted octagonal pole with a plain capital. Above is a box marked bleeco—the Brighton Lighting and Electrical Engineering Company Ltd—supporting a "swan neck" bracket with a tendril-shaped fitting and a dish-shaped lamp at the end.	
Lamp-post at 4 St James's Place	Kemptown; 50.8217°N 0.1354°W		This mid-19th-century cast iron electric light was originally a gas lamp but was later converted to electricity. The post is styled as a fluted Tuscan column, and tapers as it approaches a cylinder-shaped impost. This supports a box marked bleeco—the Brighton Lighting and Electrical Engineering Company Ltd—above which is a "swan neck" bracket with a tendril-shaped fitting and a dish-shaped lamp at the end.	
Lamp-post at St Luke's Church	Queen's Park; 50.8275°N 0.1240°W		This cast iron electric light dates from the late 19th century or later and bears the mark of bleeco—the Brighton Lighting and Electrical Engineering Company Ltd—on its socle. From this rises a fluted pole with a capital and annulet. The upper stage has a "swan neck" shape with a tendril-shaped fitting and a dish-shaped lamp at the end.	
Lamp-post at 2 St Luke's Road	Queen's Park; 50.8276°N 0.1236°W		This cast iron electric light was originally a gas lamp but was later converted to electricity. The design is of the 1880s, but this type of lamp-post was cast between that decade and 1930. From an octagonal socle rises a fluted octagonal pole with a plain capital. Above is a box marked bleeco—the Brighton Lighting and Electrical Engineering Company Ltd—supporting a "swan neck" bracket with a tendril-shaped fitting and a dish-shaped lamp at the end.	
Lamp-post at St Luke's Road/Queen's Park Terrace	Queen's Park; 50.8273°N 0.1238°W		This cast iron electric light dates from the late 19th century or later and bears the mark of bleeco—the Brighton Lighting and Electrical Engineering Company Ltd—on its socle. From this rises a fluted pole with a capital and annulet. The upper stage has a "swan neck" shape with a tendril-shaped fitting and a dish-shaped lamp at the end.	
Lamp-post at St Luke's Swimming Baths	Queen's Park; 50.8277°N 0.1224°W		This cast iron electric light was originally a gas lamp but was later converted to electricity. The design is of the 1880s, but this type of lamp-post was cast between that decade and 1930. From an octagonal socle rises a fluted octagonal pole with a plain capital. Above is a box marked bleeco—the Brighton Lighting and Electrical Engineering Company Ltd—supporting a "swan neck" bracket with a tendril-shaped fitting and a dish-shaped lamp at the end.	
Lamp-post at 23 St Luke's Terrace	Queen's Park; 50.8276°N 0.1218°W		This cast iron electric light dates from the late 19th century or later and bears the mark of bleeco—the Brighton Lighting and Electrical Engineering Company Ltd—on its socle. From this rises a fluted pole with a capital and annulet. The upper stage has a "swan neck" shape with a tendril-shaped fitting and a dish-shaped lamp at the end.	
Lamp-post at 41 St Luke's Terrace	Queen's Park; 50.8274°N 0.1212°W		This mid-19th-century cast iron electric light was originally a gas lamp but was later converted to electricity. The post is styled as a fluted Tuscan column, and tapers as it approaches a cylinder-shaped impost. This supports a box marked bleeco—the Brighton Lighting and Electrical Engineering Company Ltd—above which is a "swan neck" bracket with a tendril-shaped fitting and a dish-shaped lamp at the end.	
Lamp-post at St Luke's Terrace/St Luke's Road	Queen's Park; 50.8278°N 0.1231°W		This cast iron electric light dates from the late 19th century or later and bears the mark of bleeco—the Brighton Lighting and Electrical Engineering Company Ltd—on its socle. From this rises a fluted pole with a capital and annulet. The upper stage has a "swan neck" shape with a tendril-shaped fitting and a dish-shaped lamp at the end.	
Lamp-post at south courtyard of Brighton College	Kemptown; 50.8208°N 0.1220°W		This is one of two early- or mid-19th-century gas lamps which were later adapted for electric power and moved to their present site in Brighton College's courtyard. From its octagonal socle rises a tapering post with a palmette-moulded capital. Above this is a Windsor lamp—a style introduced in the late 19th century for use with gas mantles—which was restored in the 20th century.	
Lamp-post at south courtyard of Brighton College	Kemptown; 50.8208°N 0.1219°W		This is one of two early- or mid-19th-century gas lamps which were later adapted for electric power and moved to their present site in Brighton College's courtyard. From its octagonal socle rises a tapering post with a palmette-moulded capital. Above this is a Windsor lamp—a style introduced in the late 19th century for use with gas mantles—which was restored in the 20th century.	
Lamp-post at 5 Sussex Square	Kemp Town; 50.8168°N 0.1113°W		This mid-19th-century cast iron electric light was powered by gas until the early 20th century. The fluted post tapers as it approaches a cylinder-shaped impost. This supports a box marked bleeco—the Brighton Lighting and Electrical Engineering Company Ltd—above which is a "swan neck" bracket with a scroll-shaped fitting and a dish-shaped lamp at the end.	
Lamp-post at 13 Sussex Square	Kemp Town; 50.8174°N 0.1110°W		This mid-19th-century cast iron electric light was powered by gas until the early 20th century. The fluted post tapers as it approaches a cylinder-shaped impost. This supports a box marked bleeco—the Brighton Lighting and Electrical Engineering Company Ltd—above which is a "swan neck" bracket with a scroll-shaped fitting and a dish-shaped lamp at the end.	
Lamp-post at 17 and 18 Sussex Square	Kemp Town; 50.8177°N 0.1108°W		This mid-19th-century cast iron electric light was powered by gas until the early 20th century. The fluted post tapers as it approaches a cylinder-shaped impost. This supports a box marked bleeco—the Brighton Lighting and Electrical Engineering Company Ltd—above which is a "swan neck" bracket with a scroll-shaped fitting and a dish-shaped lamp at the end.	
Lamp-post at 23 Sussex Square	Kemp Town; 50.8177°N 0.1105°W		This mid-19th-century cast iron electric light was powered by gas until the early 20th century. The fluted post tapers as it approaches a cylinder-shaped impost. This supports a box marked bleeco—the Brighton Lighting and Electrical Engineering Company Ltd—above which is a "swan neck" bracket with a scroll-shaped fitting and a dish-shaped lamp at the end.	
Lamp-post at 28 Sussex Square	Kemp Town; 50.8176°N 0.1099°W		This mid-19th-century cast iron electric light was powered by gas until the early 20th century. The fluted post tapers as it approaches a cylinder-shaped impost. This supports a box marked bleeco—the Brighton Lighting and Electrical Engineering Company Ltd—above which is a "swan neck" bracket with a scroll-shaped fitting and a dish-shaped lamp at the end.	
Lamp-post at 34 Sussex Square	Kemp Town; 50.8174°N 0.1097°W		This mid-19th-century cast iron electric light was powered by gas until the early 20th century. The fluted post tapers as it approaches a cylinder-shaped impost. This supports a box marked bleeco—the Brighton Lighting and Electrical Engineering Company Ltd—above which is a "swan neck" bracket with a scroll-shaped fitting and a dish-shaped lamp at the end.	
Lamp-post at 38 Sussex Square	Kemp Town; 50.8171°N 0.1098°W		This mid-19th-century cast iron electric light was powered by gas until the early 20th century. The fluted post tapers as it approaches a cylinder-shaped impost. This supports a box marked bleeco—the Brighton Lighting and Electrical Engineering Company Ltd—above which is a "swan neck" bracket with a scroll-shaped fitting and a dish-shaped lamp at the end.	
Lamp-post at 46 Sussex Square	Kemp Town; 50.8165°N 0.1101°W		This mid-19th-century cast iron electric light was powered by gas until the early 20th century. The fluted post tapers as it approaches a cylinder-shaped impost. This supports a box marked bleeco—the Brighton Lighting and Electrical Engineering Company Ltd—above which is a "swan neck" bracket with a scroll-shaped fitting and a dish-shaped lamp at the end.	
Lamp-post at The Square	Patcham; 50.8646°N 0.1517°W		This mid- or late-19th-century electric light has ornate decoration all over. Between the base and the fluted pole are egg-and-dart and Tudor rose-shaped mouldings and bulbous acanthus-style ornamentation; and above the two horizontal bars (to provide support for ladders) is a Corinthian capital.	
Lamp-post at Tower Road	Queen's Park; 50.8272°N 0.1247°W		This mid-19th-century cast iron electric light was originally a gas lamp but was later converted to electricity. The post is styled as a fluted Tuscan column, and tapers as it approaches a cylinder-shaped impost. This supports a box marked bleeco—the Brighton Lighting and Electrical Engineering Company Ltd—above which is a "swan neck" bracket with a tendril-shaped fitting and a dish-shaped lamp at the end.	
Lamp-posts at Adelaide Crescent	Hove; 50.8243°N 0.1650°W		These probably date from shortly after the introduction of electric power to Hove in 1892–93. The socles start square and become octagonal by way of chamfering, and have horizontal ribbed decoration. At the top of the thin columned shafts but below the light fittings are capitals in the form of a calyx.	
Lamp-posts at Brunswick Place	Brunswick Town; 50.8259°N 0.1584°W		These probably date from shortly after the introduction of electric power to Hove in 1892–93. The socles start square and become octagonal by way of chamfering, and have horizontal ribbed decoration. At the top of the thin columned shafts but below the light fittings are capitals in the form of a calyx.	
Lamp-posts at Brunswick Square	Brunswick Town; 50.8236°N 0.1599°W		These probably date from shortly after the introduction of electric power to Hove in 1892–93. The socles start square and become octagonal by way of chamfering, and have horizontal ribbed decoration. At the top of the thin columned shafts but below the light fittings are capitals in the form of a calyx.	
Lamp-posts at Madeira Drive (west end)	Brighton; 50.8193°N 0.1357°W		These five cast iron lamp-posts stand between Brighton Aquarium and the Volk's Electric Railway station of that name. They date from 1893, but the lamps and their supporting brackets were replaced in the mid-1930s. The socle (featuring Brighton Borough's coat of arms) and shaft are both fluted, and other decorative elements include foliage, acanthus and palm-leaf designs. The coat of arms is repeated at the top of the twin brackets which support the lamps.	
Lamp-posts at St George's Church	Kemptown; 50.8183°N 0.1196°W		These two early- or mid-19th-century gas lamps are outside the main (west) door of St George's Church. The posts taper from their bases and are fluted; the capitals are in the form of a basket, which support Windsor lamps—a style introduced in the late 19th century for use with gas mantles. Both retain their original design and fittings.	
Lamp-posts at The Esplanade, Kings Road	Brighton; 50.8224°N 0.1554°W		This listing consists of 38 identical lamp-posts installed in 1893 westwards from the Palace Pier to the old Brighton Borough boundary. The lamps themselves and their supporting brackets are modern replicas of the copper and brass ones installed in the 1930s. The bases and columns are of cast iron and are elaborately decorated with foliage, acanthus and horizontal ribbed mouldings. At the top of each lamp-post is a wide basket-shaped capital. The twin lamps are suspended from ornate brackets featuring Brighton Borough's coat of arms.	
Lamp-posts at The Esplanade, Marine Parade	East Cliff; 50.8198°N 0.1350°W		This listing consists of 28 identical lamp-posts installed in 1893 eastwards along the East Cliff from Brighton Aquarium towards Kemp Town. The lamps themselves and their supporting brackets are modern replicas of the copper and brass ones installed in the 1930s. The bases and columns are of cast iron and are elaborately decorated with foliage, acanthus and horizontal ribbed mouldings. At the top of each lamp-post is a wide basket-shaped capital. The twin lamps are suspended from ornate brackets featuring Brighton Borough's coat of arms.	
Lamp-posts at The Royal Pavilion	Brighton; 50.8231°N 0.1374°W		There are 19 identical cast iron gas lamps (installed in about 1835 and converted to electricity by the start of the 20th century) in the grounds of the Royal Pavilion. Features include chamfered bases with King William IV's initials and a crown logo, octagonal posts topped with basket-shaped capitals and a mechanism box bearing the mark of bleeco—the Brighton Lighting and Electrical Engineering Company Ltd.	
Lamp-posts east of Aquarium railway station	East Cliff; 50.8188°N 0.1313°W		These sixteen cast iron lamp-posts, erected in about 1893, stand east of the Volk's Electric Railway Aquarium station. The socle is octagonal and supports a partly fluted column with some foliage decoration near the bottom. Above a capital in the shape of a palm leaf are two brackets supporting twin octagonal lamps, all topped by more foliage decoration and the Brighton Borough coat of arms.	
Lanes Hotel^{[C]}	East Cliff; 50.8188°N 0.1280°W		.	
1–7 Lansdowne Place^{[A]}	Hove; 50.8240°N 0.1617°W		.	
2–48 Lansdowne Place^{[A]}	Hove; 50.8258°N 0.1602°W		.	
13 and 15 Lansdowne Place^{[A]}	Hove; 50.8244°N 0.1616°W		.	
17 and 19 Lansdowne Place^{[A]}	Hove; 50.8246°N 0.1615°W		.	
21, 21a and 23 Lansdowne Place^{[B]}	Hove; 50.8248°N 0.1613°W		.	
25–31 Lansdowne Place^{[A]}	Hove; 50.8250°N 0.1612°W		.	
33–55 Lansdowne Place	Hove; 50.8256°N 0.1610°W		.	
52–118 Lansdowne Place^{[B]}	Hove; 50.8275°N 0.1594°W		.	
59–127 Lansdowne Place^{[B]}	Hove; 50.8261°N 0.1607°W		.	
1–3 Lansdowne Square^{[A]}	Hove; 50.8247°N 0.1618°W		.	
4–6 Lansdowne Square^{[A]}	Hove; 50.8248°N 0.1619°W		.	
7–9 Lansdowne Square^{[A]}	Hove; 50.8249°N 0.1617°W		.	
Little Courtenay	Hove; 50.8247°N 0.1736°W		.	
6 Little East Street	Brighton; 50.8202°N 0.1397°W		.	
8 Little East Street	Brighton; 50.8201°N 0.1398°W		.	
8 Lock's Hill	Portslade; 50.8393°N 0.2174°W		.	
87 London Road	Round Hill; 50.8326°N 0.1374°W		.	
1 and 2 Lower Market Street	Hove; 50.8237°N 0.1574°W		.	
6–10 Lower Market Street^{[A]}	Hove; 50.8239°N 0.1578°W		.	
8 and 9 Lower Rock Gardens^{[A]}	Kemptown; 50.8200°N 0.1305°W		.	

== See also ==
- Buildings and architecture of Brighton and Hove
- Grade I listed buildings in Brighton and Hove
- Grade II* listed buildings in Brighton and Hove
- List of conservation areas in Brighton and Hove
