= King and Queen, Brighton =

Listed pub in East Sussex, England

King and Queen
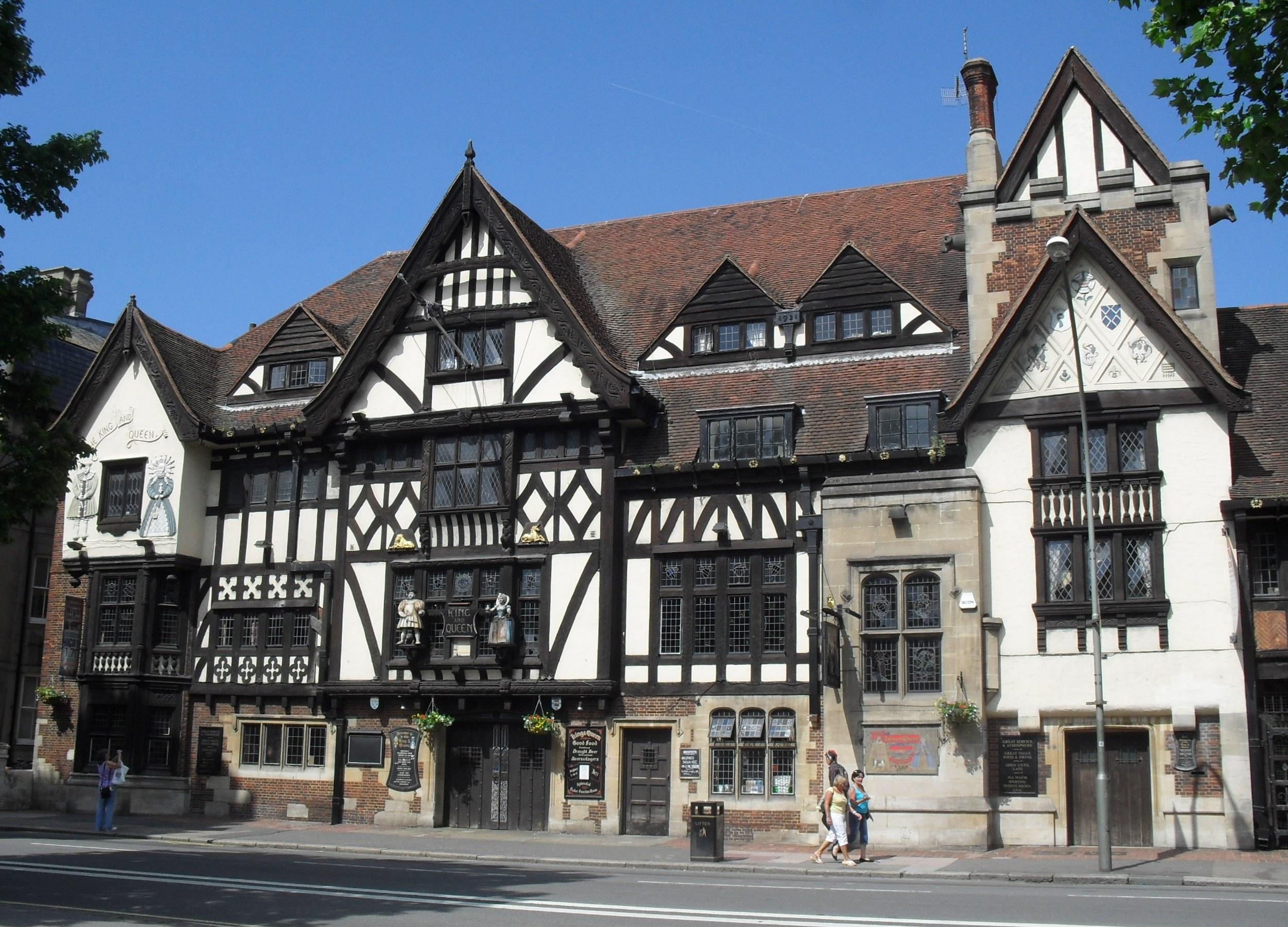
- The pub from the east-northeast in 2010

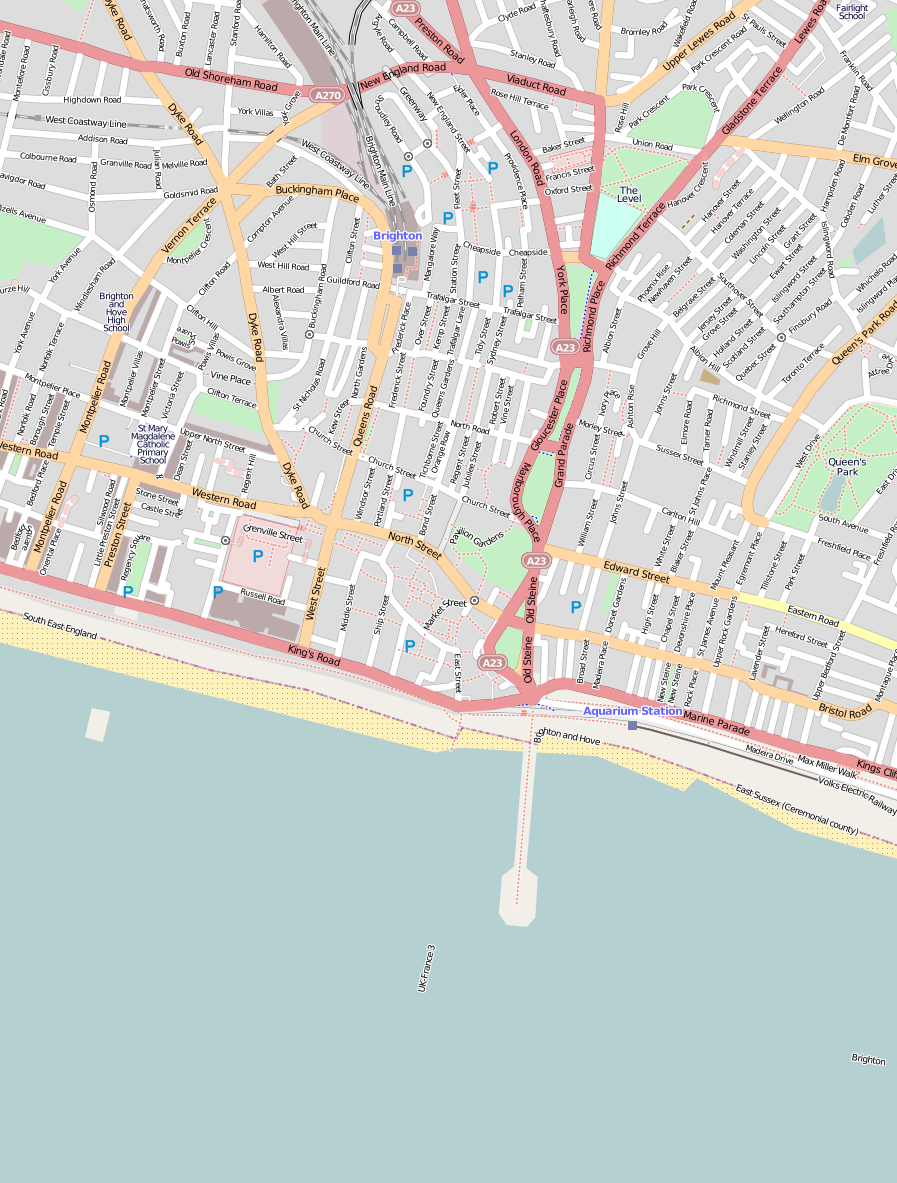
- Location within central Brighton
- Alternative names: Ye Olde King and Queen; King and Queen Hotel

General information
- Type: Public house
- Architectural style: Mock Tudor
- Location: 13–17 Marlborough Place, Brighton, England
- Coordinates: 50.8246°N 0.1371°W
- Completed: 1932; 94 years ago

Design and construction
- Architect: Clayton & Black
- Designations

Listed Building – Grade II
- Official name: The King and Queen Hotel
- Designated: 19 March 1997
- Reference no.: 1381770

Website
- thekingandqueen.co.uk

The King and Queen (also known as Ye Olde King and Queen and the King and Queen Hotel) is a Grade II listed public house on Marlborough Place in Brighton, part of the city of Brighton and Hove, England. The present building, designed by Clayton & Black and completed in 1932, occupies the site of a pub established in 1860. The earlier public house had been converted from a farmhouse dating from the 18th century. Designed in the Mock Tudor style and incorporating materials associated with 16th-century vernacular architecture, the building is noted for its elaborate decorative treatment and distinctive interior and exterior features.

== History ==
Brighton developed into a fashionable resort in the 18th and 19th centuries, with Old Steine as one of its focal points. This was at the southern end of a large area of poorly drained, low-lying open space that later became known as Valley Gardens. The first residential development outside the four-street boundary of the ancient village was in 1771–72, when North Row was built on the west side of the open land. It was renamed Marlborough Place in 1819. One old building was incorporated into the street: a farmhouse which was refronted in the Georgian style and became the King and Queen pub in 1779. The name commemorated King George III and Queen Charlotte. Brighton was well provided with inns and beerhouses at this time: the town had 41 by 1800, or one for every 30 households, and many private houses sold unlicensed alcohol.

At first the inn catered mostly for agricultural workers from the surrounding farms, although players and spectators involved in cricket matches on the adjacent open land also used the inn. (This trade ceased when the area was enclosed in 1817 to form parkland now known as Victoria Gardens.) An army barracks stood behind the pub, and for many years its soldiers were supplied with alcohol through a secret hole and passageway in the rear wall. The barracks, originally for infantry and later the home of the 1st Sussex Rifles and 1st Sussex Artillery Volunteers regiments, closed in 1870; the Blenheim Hotel and the town's first courthouse now occupy the site.

The inn's importance increased further in the early 19th century when Brighton's corn market was established there: it moved from another Brighton inn, the Old Ship Hotel, in or before 1822, and was held every Thursday. On 1 October 1868 it moved again to the former riding school of the Royal Pavilion, built in 1803–08 by William Porden. Other 19th-century events included the inquest of a man killed during rioting in Old Steine in 1817.

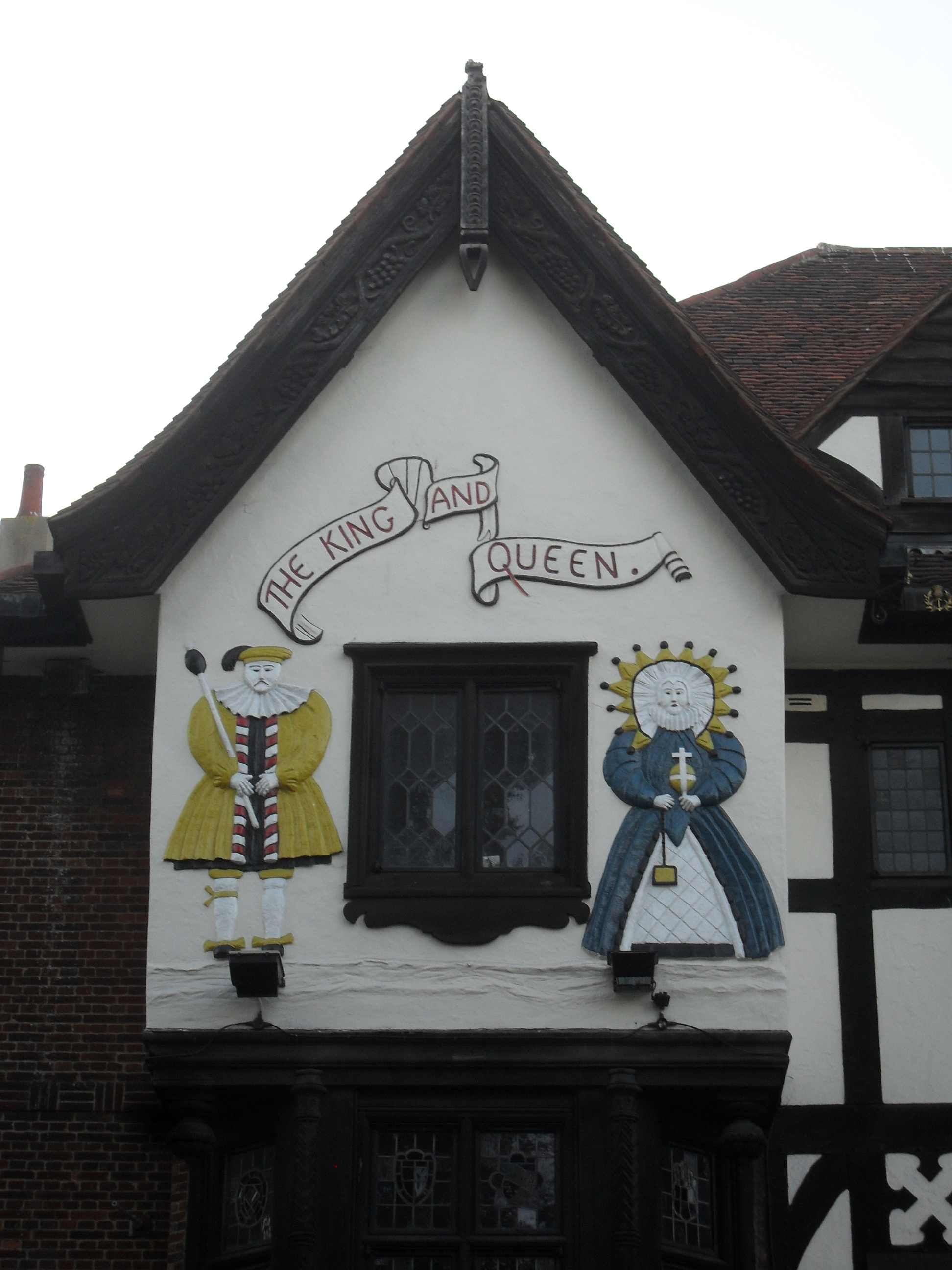
The new building portrays a different king and queen—Henry VIII and Anne Boleyn.

The pub and most of the buildings north of it, as far as the junction with Church Street, were rebuilt in the 1930s. Prominent local architecture firm Clayton & Black were commissioned to redesign the inn in 1931. Their chosen style for the rebuilding was Mock Tudor, which was fashionable at the time, and the bow-fronted two-storey Georgian exterior was completely changed to form a "striking interwar interloper" amongst neighbouring buildings such as the Neo-Georgian Allied Irish Bank branch and a series of four-storey offices. The interior was also altered to the design of Ashby Tabb of the interior design firm Heaton Tabb & Company, who added stained glass and a barrel-vaulted wooden ceiling at first-floor level, where a "children's room" was created. This later became a general function room. Clayton & Black extended the pub to the north in 1935–36, adding a two-storey section. Although the King and Queen name was retained, the monarchs represented were changed at this time to Henry VIII and Anne Boleyn, and their images were painted beneath one of the gables. A contemporary report in the Brighton Herald newspaper praised the rebuilt pub, stating that it was "something more than a handsome, spacious building ... it is a gorgeous flight of architectural imagination".

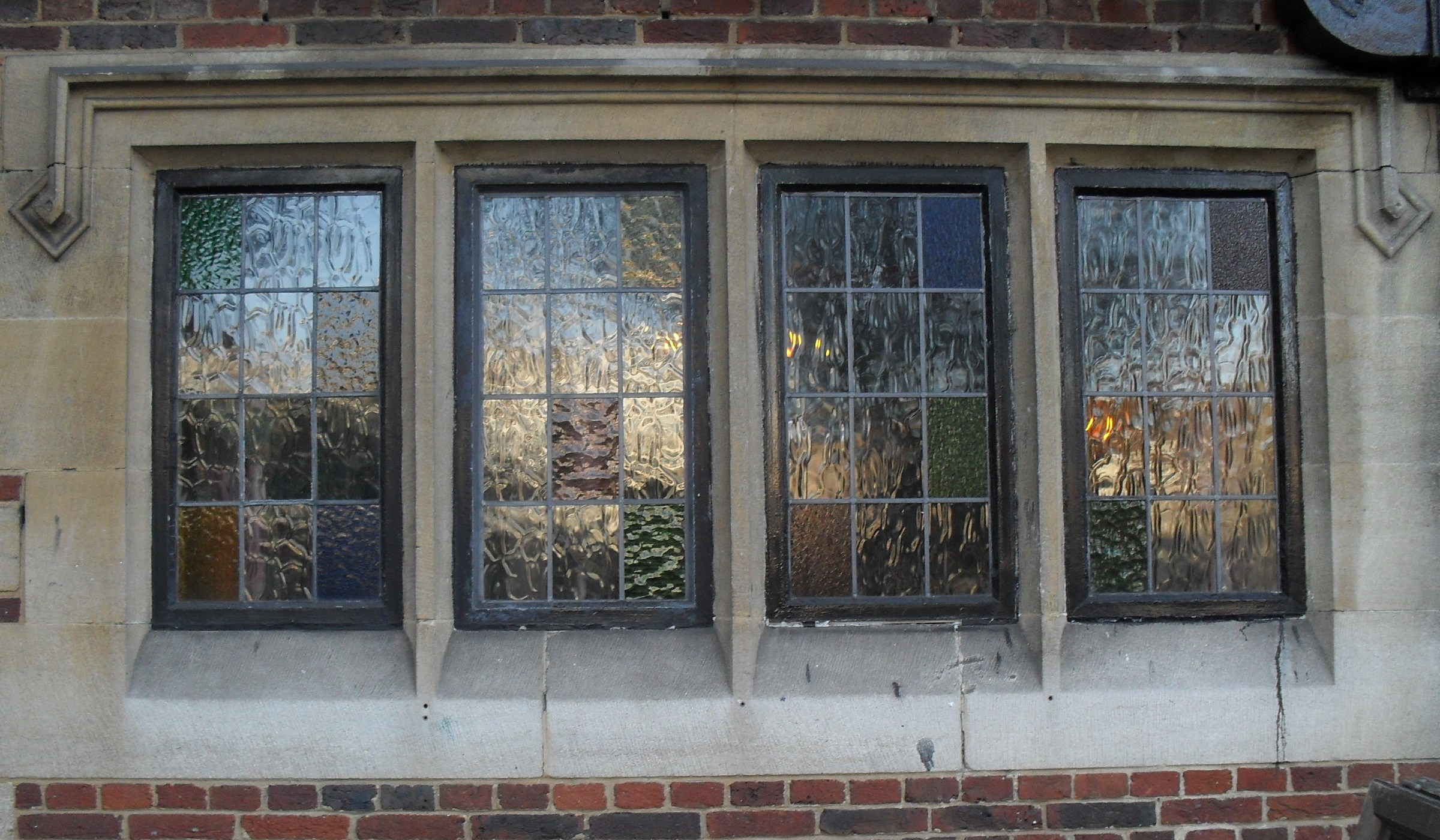
The pub has medieval-style decorative windows.

The interior was altered in 1967, when the original three-room space was reconfigured to form a single room "in the form of a spacious medieval nobleman's hall". This made it suitable for hosting large events, such as "Miss Miniskirt" contest finals (for several years) and revues; Margaret Thatcher visited one unannounced in 1982 while in Brighton for the Conservative Party conference. There is a large courtyard and garden area, first used in 1968 when a new owner laid on regular barbecues. The pub markets itself as a sports bar, with large screen televisions and several pool tables, and as a music venue; local DJ Fatboy Slim has played there, and there is a regular karaoke night.

The pub was Grade II listed by English Heritage on 19 March 1997. Grade II designation identifies a building as being of special interest. As of February 2001, it was one of 1,124 Grade II-listed buildings and structures, and one of 1,218 listed buildings of all grades, in Brighton and Hove. The pub also stands within the Valley Gardens Conservation Area, one of 34 conservation areas in Brighton and Hove. On 24 October 2015, it was registered as an asset of community value by Brighton and Hove City Council. The King and Queen is regarded by the Campaign for Real Ale (CAMRA) as having an interior of "outstanding national historic importance" and is rated three stars on its National Inventory of Historic Pub Interiors.

== Architecture ==
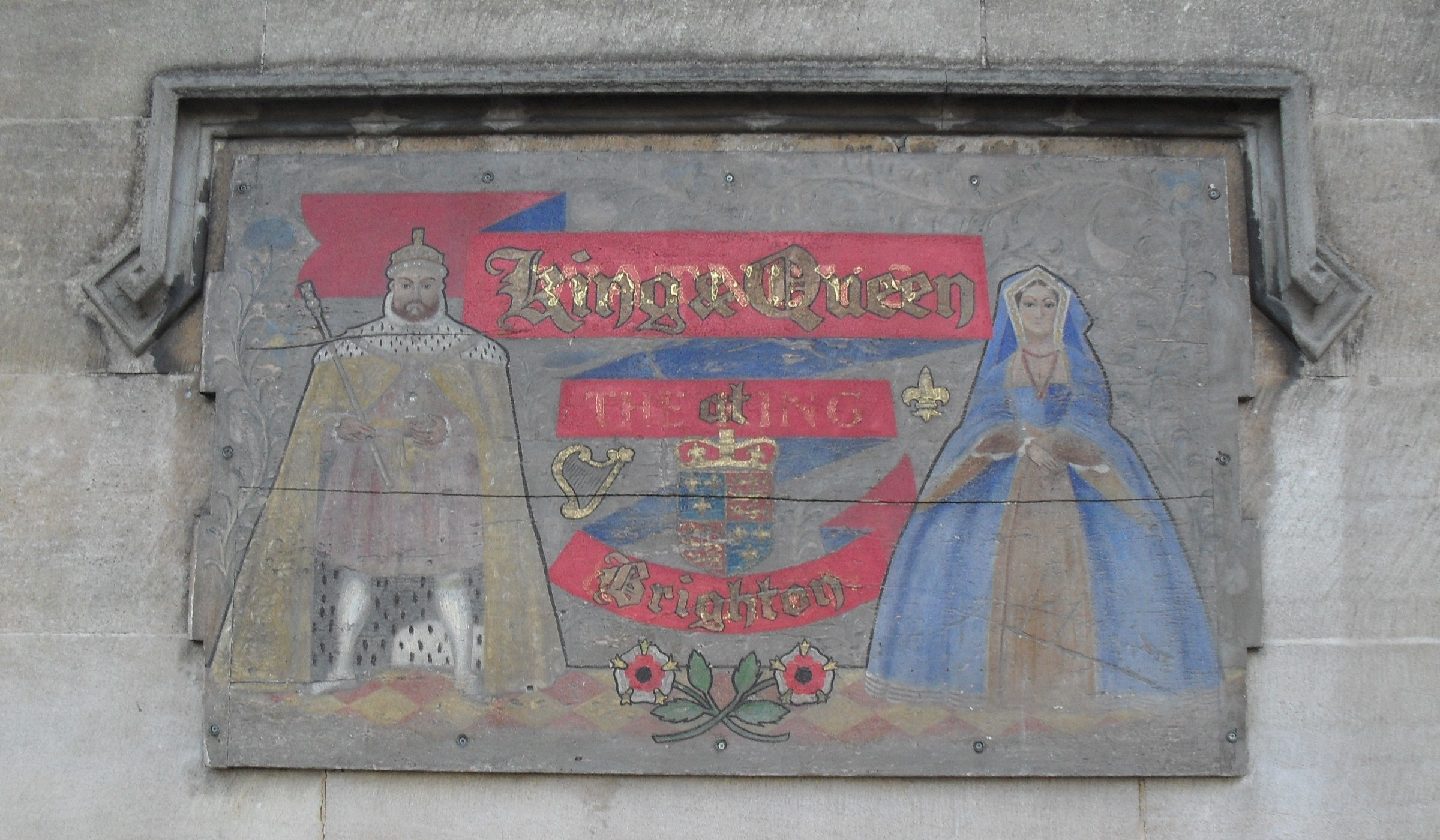
This painted panel shows Henry VIII and Anne Boleyn.

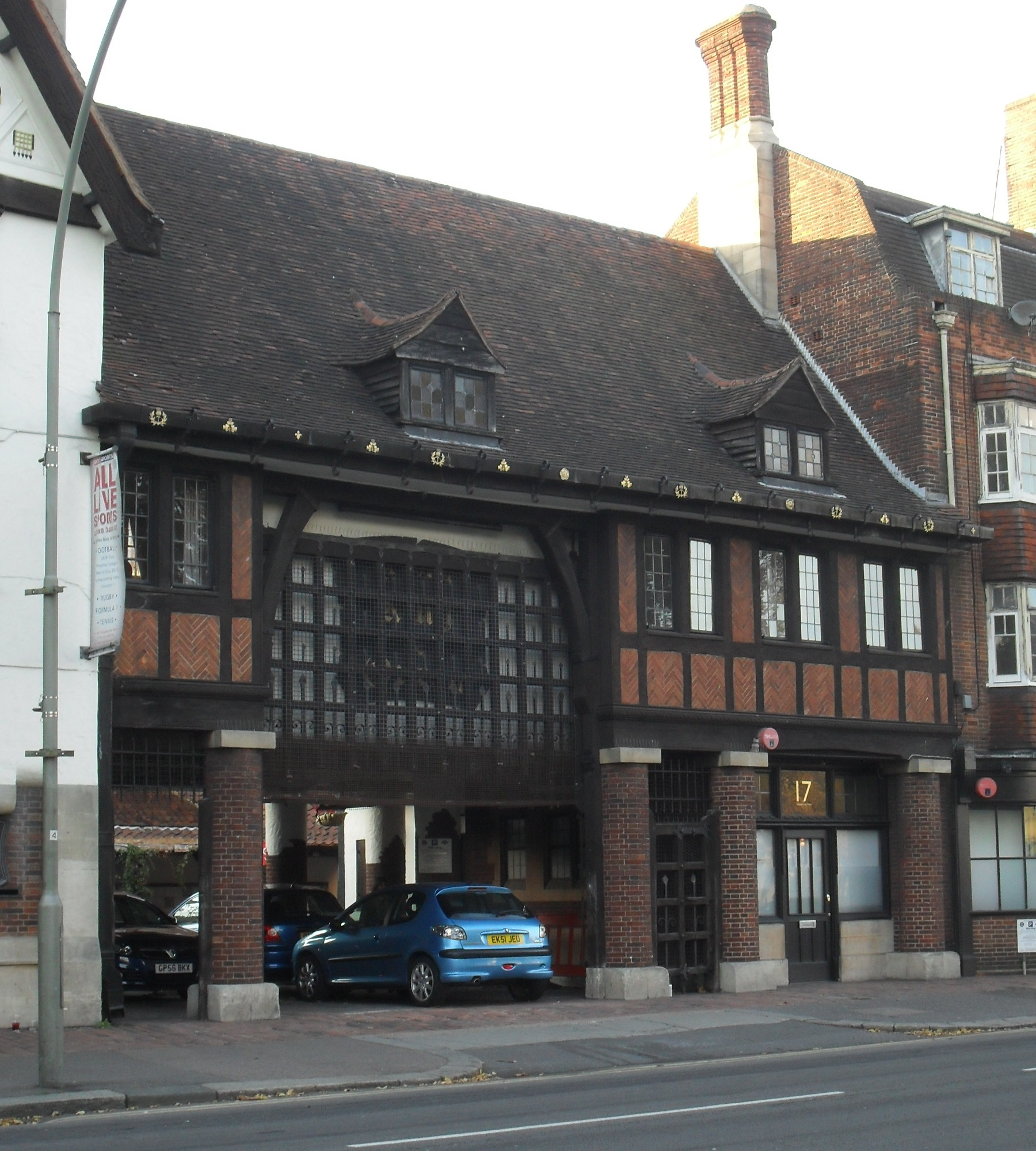
The two-storey north wing dates from 1935–36.

The King and Queen has been widely praised for its distinctive, elaborately detailed architecture. Clayton & Black's "theatrical rebuilding", completed in 1932, created an architectural "pantomime" of "olde-worlde Tudor" elements incorporating "an impressive array of seemingly authentic details". The architects used a "wonderful assembly" of features commonly associated with 16th-century Vernacular architecture, selecting those which gave the most decorative appearance and allowed the widest variety of materials to be used. The main structure is of red brick laid in the English bond pattern; there is stonework to the ground floor, plaster and timber framing above, and a tiled roof with three weatherboarded dormer windows at the top (attic) storey, below which are the two main storeys. To the right (north) side is a two-storey section dating from 1935–36.

The main section has five bays of unequal width; the first, third and fifth project slightly and have large gables. The third bay, the largest, has an entrance with a Tudor arch and double wooden doors, and there are smaller entrances in the fourth and fifth bays, again with similar doors featuring panelling and metal grilles set in moulded doorcases. Projecting forward between the fourth and fifth bays is the stone-dressed exterior of a stair-turret with a pair of Tudor-arched stained glass windows divided by a thick transom and set in a recess with a hood mould. The glass depicts knights and medieval ladies. The first (southernmost) bay rises to three storeys, of which the lower two have canted bay windows with mullions and transoms. The top storey, with its intricately decorated gable, is jettied and features painted plaster reliefs of Henry VIII and Anne Boleyn with another mullioned and transomed window between them. Carved figures of the same king and queen are supported on brackets above the main entrance at first-floor level, in front of another medieval-style straight-headed window. Above this are gold lion and unicorn figures flanking carved corbels which support a three-light diamond-patterned window. On each side are smaller four-light windows of a similar pattern. A carved bressummer separates these from the half-timbered gable above. The second and fourth bays, slightly recessed, have plaster façades with applied carved timber framing and mullioned and transomed windows. The fifth bay, also plaster-clad, has two three-window ranges linked by a timber balustrade pattern and set below an elaborate gable with painted heraldic emblems, coats of arms and similar. Rising behind this gable is a stone-quoined brick tower topped with a chimney and another gable, from which two carved sheep's heads project.

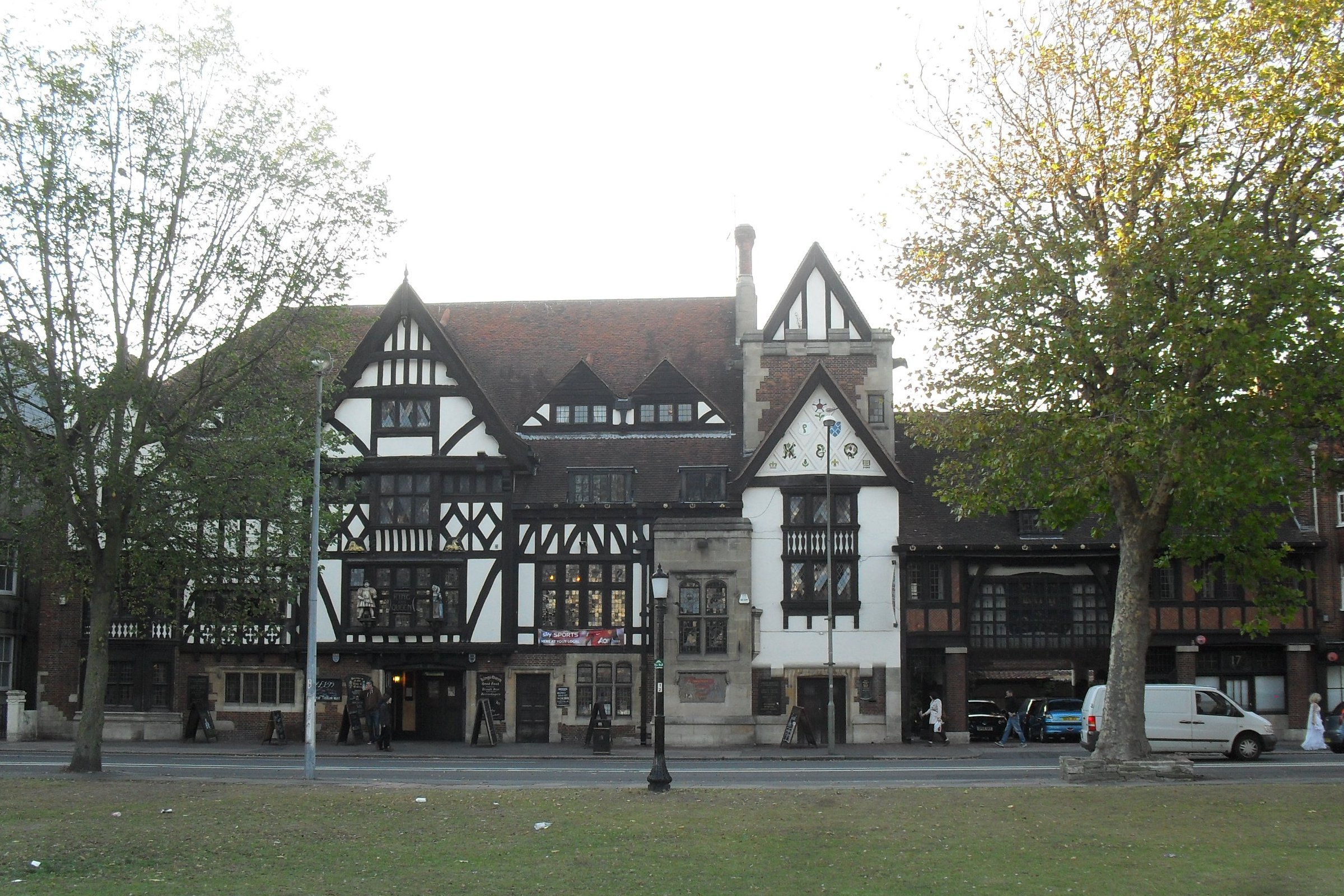
The exterior has a series of half-timbered gables.

The north wing is mostly timber-framed with nogging infill. There is herringbone brickwork at first-floor level around the series of two-light windows. Much use is made of decorative ironwork: the ground floor is mostly open in the form of an oak-braced carriage arch with a portcullis, and between the brick piers which divide the wing into a series of bays are entrances with "fearsome wrought iron embellishments". The tiled roof has two gabled dormers. The part of this wing facing inwards towards the courtyard has brick and timberwork with balustrades and gables, and there is an open gallery on one side. Carved medieval figures are found in several places.

Inside, despite the opening out of Heaton Tabb & Co's original three-room interior in 1967, many 1930s features remain, including a wood and wrought iron bar, a balustraded gallery (with later glazing), moulded fireplaces, decorative coloured glass with heraldic emblems, tapestries, timber panelling with linenfold carving, panelled doors with iron grilles, carved oak beams and lintels and medieval-style carved settles. A curved staircase leading to the first-floor function room apparently dates from the 1967 alterations; it has a balustrade and stained glass inserts.

== See also ==
- Grade II listed buildings in Brighton and Hove: I–L
- Pubs in Brighton
