= Pubs in Brighton =

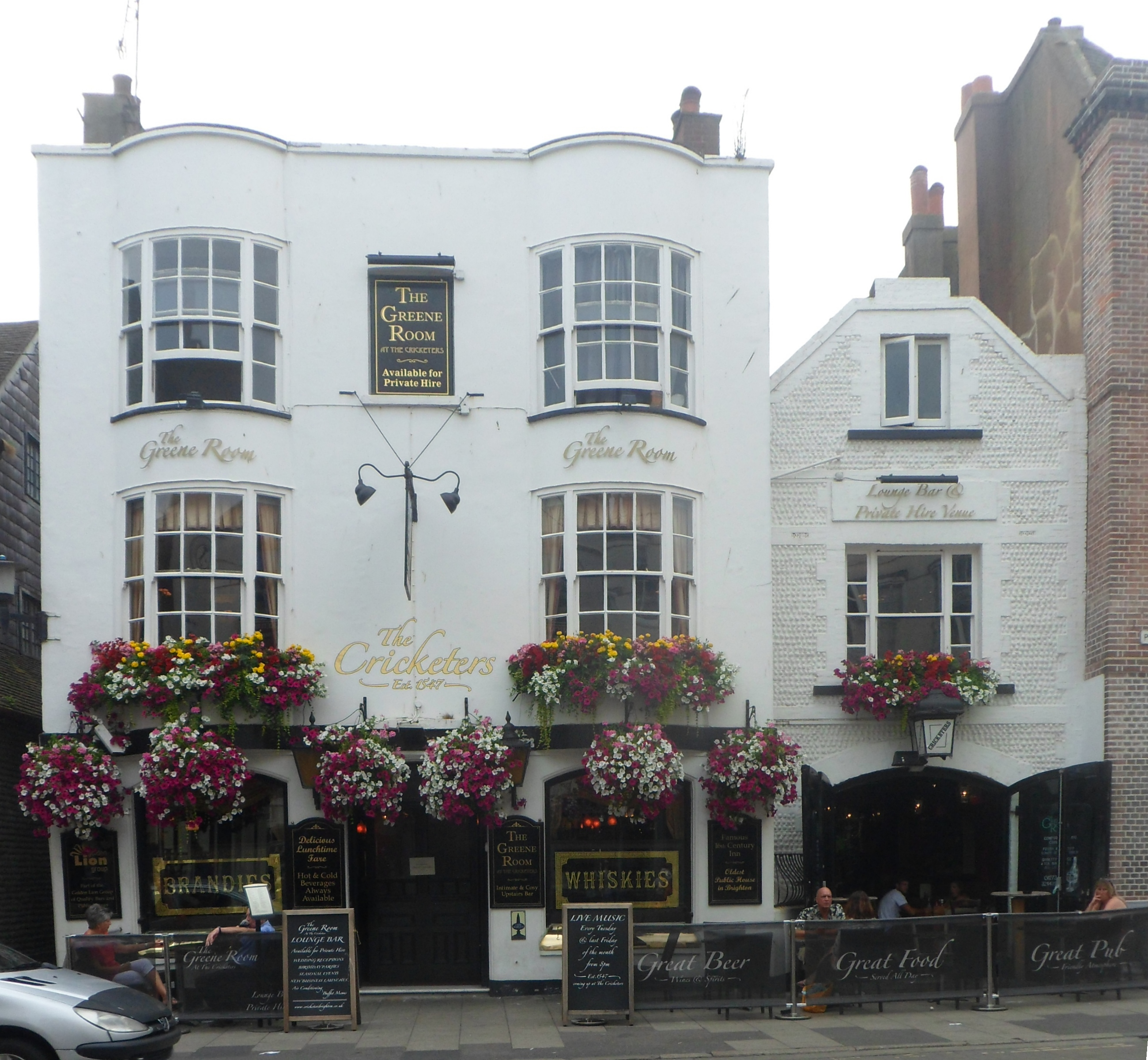
The Cricketers Inn is the oldest pub in Brighton, although the present building is Victorian.

Public houses, popularly known as pubs, are a significant feature of the history and culture of the English seaside resort of Brighton. The earliest pubs trace their history back to the 16th and 17th centuries, when present-day Brighton (now part of the city of Brighton and Hove) was a fishing village. Several coaching inns were founded in the 18th century as transport improved and communications with other towns developed, and around the same time other pubs became established in the fashionable Old Steine area in Brighton's early years as a resort. Many new pubs, originally beerhouses, were established after an Act of Parliament in 1830 loosened restrictions; two of these "Beerhouse Act" pubs remain in business. In the following decade the opening of Brighton's railway station provided another major boost to the pub trade, and by the late 19th century there were nearly 800 licensed venues in the town. Numbers declined gradually—as late as 1958 there was said to be "one pub for every day of the year"—and by the early 21st century around 300 pubs were still trading, with others having closed but surviving in alternative use.

Many of Brighton's pubs are architecturally important: a large number have either nationally or locally listed status. Some pubs have been converted from older buildings, usually houses; others are purpose-built; and some have been revamped into completely different styles, from Regency to Mock Tudor.

== History ==
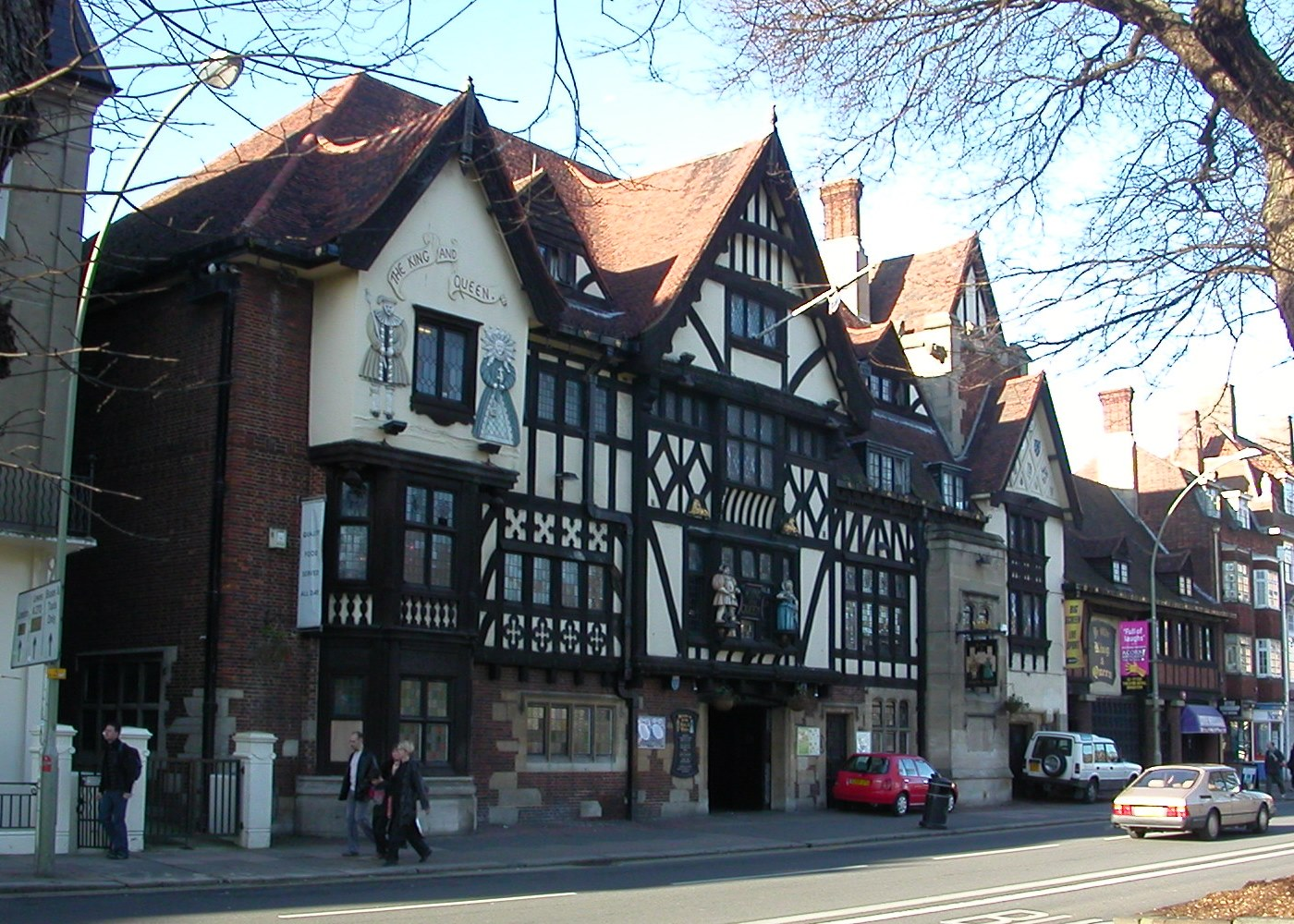
The 18th-century King and Queen pub was rebuilt in the 1930s.

The first inn in the village of Brighthelmstone, which became modern Brighton, was the Cricketers Inn in The Lanes, Brighton's historic centre. It was founded in 1545 as the Laste and Fishcart and originally served the town's fishermen, but took its present name when it later became a coaching inn (evidence of the stables survived well into the 20th century). The Old Ship, now a hotel, also served as an inn and was documented as such in 1665, but may have even older origins: the Gilham family, which owned it in the 17th century, also owned "an unnamed house" in Brighton in 1559. North Street, which formed the northern boundary of the old town, was lined with coaching inns for many years until it ceased to be the main route in and out of Brighton in the early 19th century: the former Clarence Hotel, built as the New Inn in 1785, is the only survivor. (Note: It was later converted into offices but is now empty. Planning applications to convert the ground floor into a restaurant and the upper storeys into flats were submitted in 2022 and 2021 respectively.) Its stables could accommodate 80 horses. The White Lion, which stood approximately where the Clock Tower was built in 1888, was a 16th-century building which was converted into an inn by 1790, and possibly as early as 1757. After its demolition in 1874, a replacement was built nearby but was in turn demolished for the Regent Cinema—as was the Unicorn Inn, opened in the mid-18th century in a building dating from 1597.

In Brighton's early days as a seaside resort, in the 18th and early 19th centuries, the open land of Old Steine was its focal point. The town's oldest pubs were in this area, including the Castle Tavern—converted from a house in 1752—and the King and Queen, a former farmhouse which was renovated as an inn in 1779. The Castle Inn catered mostly for wealthy visitors who were in town for the season, while the King and Queen was used mainly by agricultural workers and soldiers in the adjacent barracks, who could be supplied with alcohol through a secret hole in the rear wall of the pub. The Royal Pavilion Tavern near the Castle Inn was converted from a house into a hotel between 1816 and 1820 and soon became a pub, taking the place of the Castle Inn which declined and was demolished in 1823.

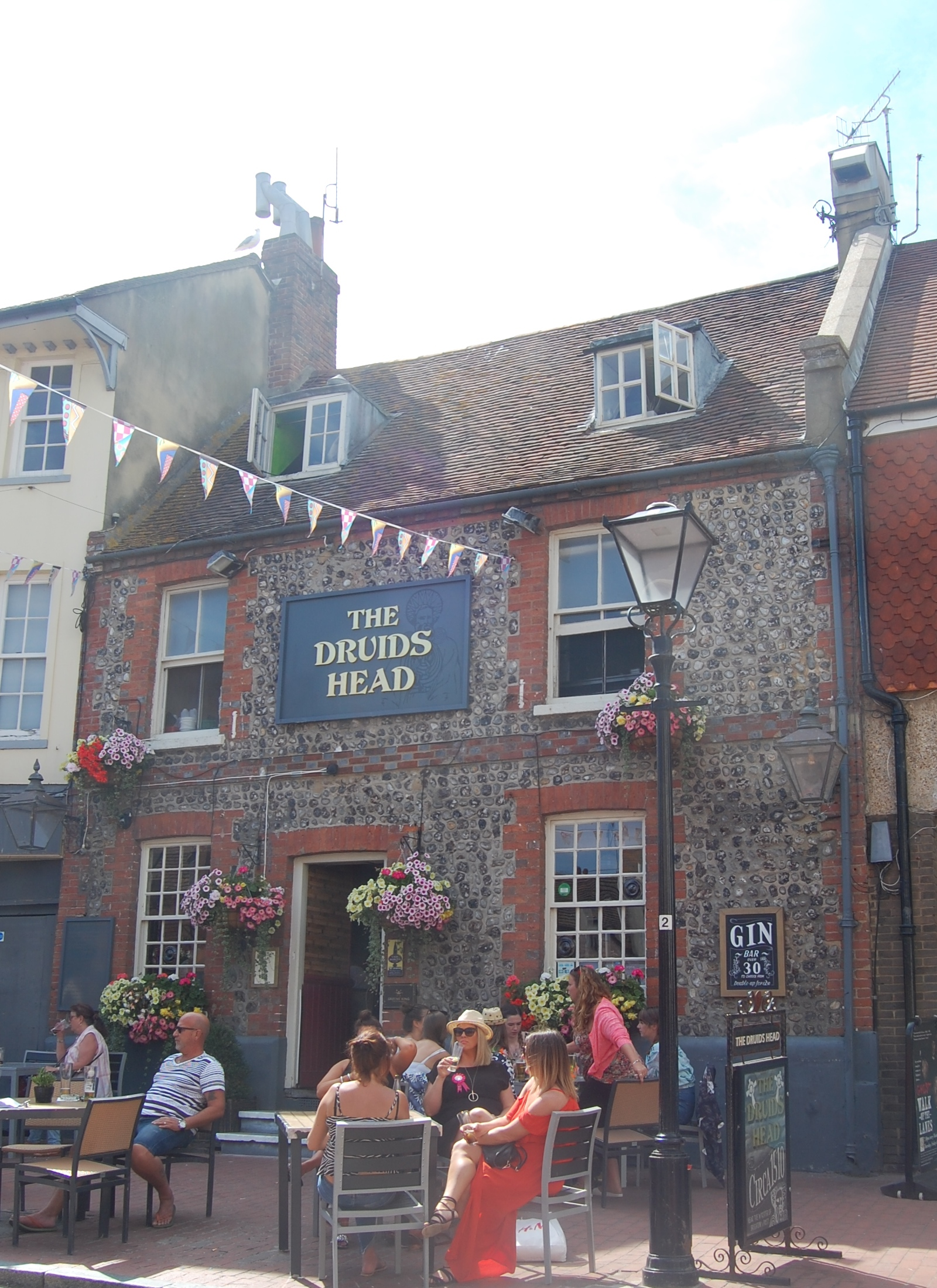
The Druid's Head was one of 100 pubs and beerhouses opened in the first week after the Beerhouse Act 1830 was passed.

The first stimulus to Brighton's pub trade was the rapid increase in stagecoach traffic in the 18th century, encouraged both by the increasing popularity and fashionable status of the town as a result of its royal patronage and by its increasing importance as the commercial centre of Sussex. In the 1780s, a ferry service between Brighton and Dieppe in France was started; mail coaches started running between the town and London; and the Prince of Wales came for the first of his many visits. Coaching inns such as the Star and Garter and the White Horse were established to cater for the increasing traffic, and the Castle Inn grew in importance. (None of these inns survive, and the present Black Lion Inn at Patcham, built in 1929, is a replacement on a different site of the historic coaching inn of that name at an important location on the main road to London.) Some pubs from the town's early days remain in business though: in The Lanes, Brighton's historic core, the Cricketers, the Black Lion and the Spotted Dog all existed by 1791 and are still open. (Note: The Spotted Dog is now called the Hop Poles.) In 1800 there were 41 licensed inns and pubs in Brighton, which at the time had a population of about 7,500.

The next significant event was the passing of the Beerhouse Act 1830, which allowed any member of the public to open their house or other premises as a beerhouse or beer shop (essentially a pub), and brew beer there if they wished, upon application to HM Excise and payment of a fee. The criteria were less strict than those applied to traditional inns and public houses. During the first week in which the Act was in force, 100 beerhouses were licensed in Brighton, which at the time had a population of about 40,000. Of these 100 newly established beerhouses, two survive as pubs: the Regency Tavern in Regency Square and the Druid's Head in The Lanes. The Druid's Head, originally an 18th-century detached house with its own garden, became the focus for postal carrier arrivals and departures after it was converted into an inn.

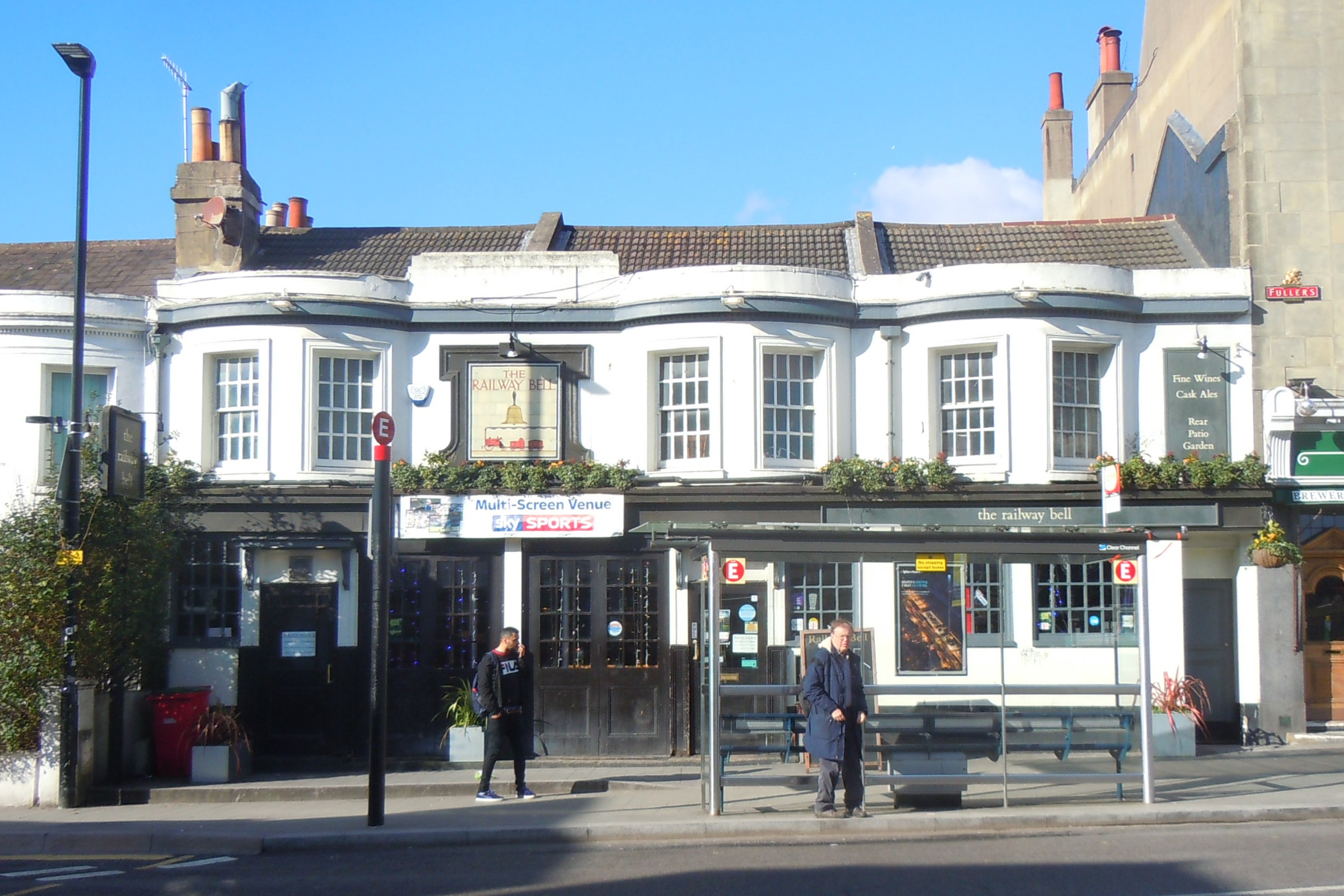
The Railway Bell is one of several pubs built near Brighton railway station.

A decade later, the coming of the railway to Brighton further stimulated the local pub trade. Brighton station opened in 1841, and numerous pubs opened in the streets nearby: there were eight in Surrey Street alone by 1891, and Queen's Road "became lined with [them]" after it was laid out in 1845 (by 1891 there were 15 pubs on this road, which leads south from the station to the seafront.) Survivors around the station include the Queen's Head, which retains "its typical mid-19th-century façade", the Railway Bell, the Grand Central (formerly the Railway Inn), the Evening Star (where the Dark Star brewery was founded in 1994), the Battle of Trafalgar and the Sussex Yeoman. At Preston Park station, the Station Hotel opened in 1894. The Signalman (Railway Hotel) opposite London Road station is believed to have been built around the same time as the station opened in 1877. A pub called the Railway Arms on Freshfield Road was built close to the former Kemp Town railway station but was disused by 1945. The railway also inspired some pub names: the Good Companions (built in 1939) was named after a steam locomotive, and former pubs include the Locomotive Inn and the Railway Guard. Many other pubs commemorate local people and events: examples include the London Unity, named after a ship which rescued a hot air balloonist who had fallen into the English Channel in an attempt to fly from Brighton to France; the Queensbury [sic] Arms, behind the seafront, named after John Douglas, 9th Marquess of Queensberry who had a house nearby; the Constant Service, named after the local water company of that name; the Bat and Ball opposite The Level, named after the cricket and other bat-and-ball games which took place on The Level; and the Pedestrian Arms in North Laine, whose landlord from 1869 was a "champion long-distance roadwalker".

By 1860, 479 pubs were recorded in Brighton. (Note: The distinction between pubs and beerhouses had faded by the 1860s.) The number of licensed premises continued to rise: 774 were recorded in 1889 (one per 130 inhabitants) and about 700 were still open in 1900. By 1935 the number had reduced to 495. In 1958 it was said (Note: This quote is from a licensing officer speaking in 1965 and contrasting the position in 1958 with the contemporary situation.) to be possible for a person "to use a different pub each day of the year without leaving the boundaries of Brighton"; but after World War II pubs everywhere went into decline as alternative leisure activities became more popular and land values rose, encouraging failing pubs to be demolished and their sites redeveloped. Many were lost during postwar urban renewal. For example, in 1930 there were nine pubs on Sussex Street in the Carlton Hill area, notorious for its slum housing; none survive. Carlton Hill itself, a road running through the area, had 13 in 1891; again, all have closed and most have been demolished. In 2005 about 300 pubs survived in Brighton.

Many of Brighton's pubs, including the historic Castle Inn, were centres of cock-fighting, bear- and badger-baiting and dog-fighting in the 18th and 19th centuries. Bear-baiting gave its name to the 18th-century Bear Inn on Lewes Road and then to Bear Road (and by extension the whole residential area around it) when that road was laid out in the 19th century. The pub has been rebuilt but retains the name. The White Lion on North Street was a significant local centre of cock-fighting.

== Areas ==
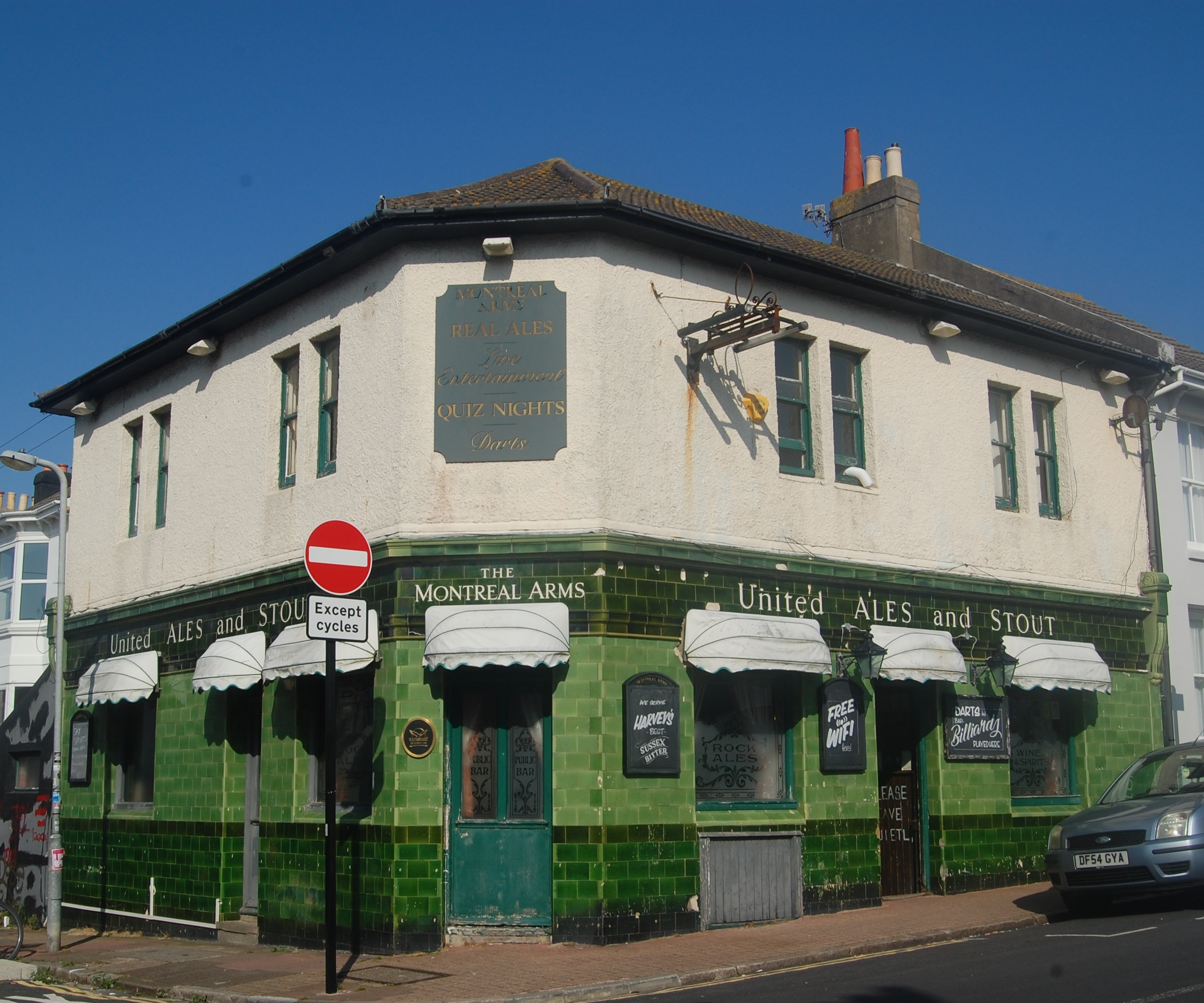
The Montreal Arms (closed in 2020) was one of many pubs in the Hanover area of Brighton.

Central Brighton has always had the largest number of pubs. Particular concentrations are found around Brighton railway station, The Lanes (the historic "old town") and St James's Street, a major road running from Old Steine towards Kemptown. Other main roads with numerous pubs include Ditchling Road and Lewes Road.

The Hanover area northeast of central Brighton has always been well known for its high concentration of pubs. From the area's earliest development in the mid-19th century "there was a beer house or inn on nearly every street corner". There have been at least five pubs on Southover Street continuously since 1867; as of 2015 the Southover (now Haus on the Hill; formerly The Pub with No Name and The Royal Exchange), the Sir Charles Napier, the Dover Castle, The Geese Have Gone Over the Water and The Greys were open. The Fox Inn, which closed in the 1920s, was the first pub on the street: it opened in 1845 and preceded most of street's housing. Other Hanover pubs include the Reservoir, the Hanover, the Islingword Inn (Duke of Beaumont), the Constant Service, the Montreal Arms, the Independent (formerly the Walmer Castle) and the Cobden Arms. The London Unity (1880) closed in 2014, and two other 19th-century pubs in the area closed the following year: the Horse and Groom and the Albion Inn. The Montreal Arms closed in 2020 and was sold in 2022, and in March 2023 the owners of the Hanover pub announced it would close at the end of the month and would be demolished for housing.

== Ownership ==
Many pubs in Brighton are owned by breweries or national pub chains. The Fuller's chain operates the Grand Central near Brighton station, the Sir Charles Napier in Hanover, the Basketmakers Arms in North Laine and the Prestonville Arms in the Prestonville area. The Shepherd Neame Brewery owns the Bath Arms in The Lanes, the Caxton Arms in the West Hill area, the Prince of Wales at Clarence Square, the Regency Tavern at Regency Square and the Dover Castle in Hanover. Greene King operates the Druid's Head and The Sussex in The Lanes, the Fiveways at Hollingdean and the White Horse Inn at Rottingdean. Of the three Wetherspoons pubs in the city of Brighton and Hove, two are in central Brighton (in North Street and West Street) and one is at Brighton Marina. (Note: There was another in Hove, but it was put up for sale in September 2022 and closed in March 2023.) There are also branches of the All Bar One, BrewDog and Walkabout chains.

Local breweries which operate tied houses in Brighton include Harvey's of Lewes, which owns the Constant Service in Hanover, the Lord Nelson near Brighton station, the Mitre Tavern near London Road and the Maris and Otter taproom on Western Road; the Holler Brewery, which acquired new premises in the New England Quarter and opened a taproom there in early 2019; and the Brighton Bier brewery, which has three pubs. They took over a 200-year-old Grade II-listed pub on Edward Street in early 2017 and named it Brighton Bierhaus; converted the former Southover pub on Southover Street in Hanover into the Haus on the Hill in late 2018; and took over the former Reservoir pub, also in Hanover, in May 2019 and renamed it the Free Haus. The Laine Pub Company, formed in Brighton and bought in 2018 by national operator Punch Pubs, owns more than 30 pubs in the city of Brighton and Hove; those in Brighton include the seafront pub the Fortune of War, the Fiddler's Elbow and the Hope and Ruin in the city centre, the Thomas Kemp (now the Kemp) and the Sidewinder in Kemptown, the Open House and the Signalman, both of which are adjacent to London Road railway station, and the North Laine Brewhouse at Gloucester Place.

== Buildings and architecture ==
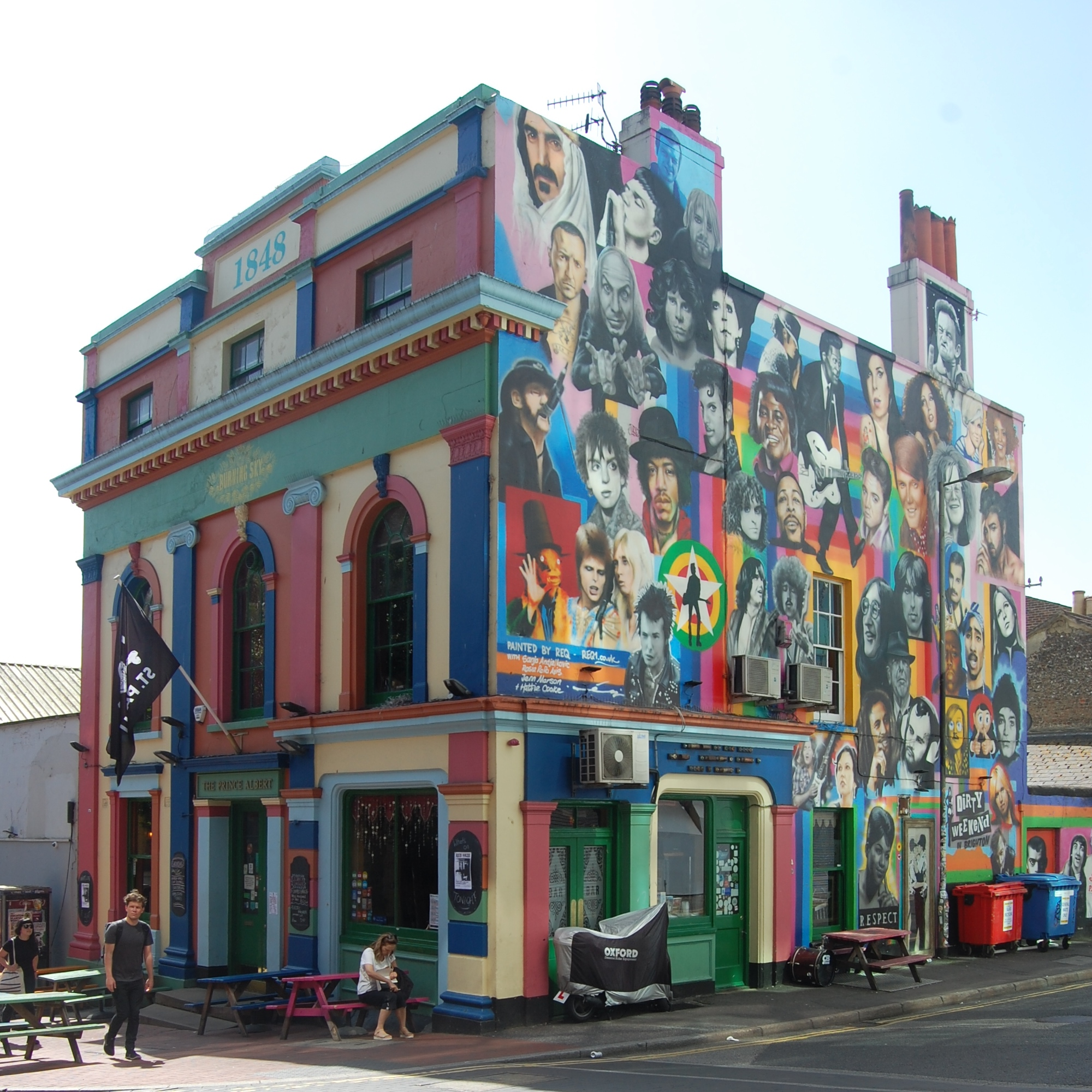
Listed pubs in Brighton include the Prince Albert, built near the railway station in the 1840s.

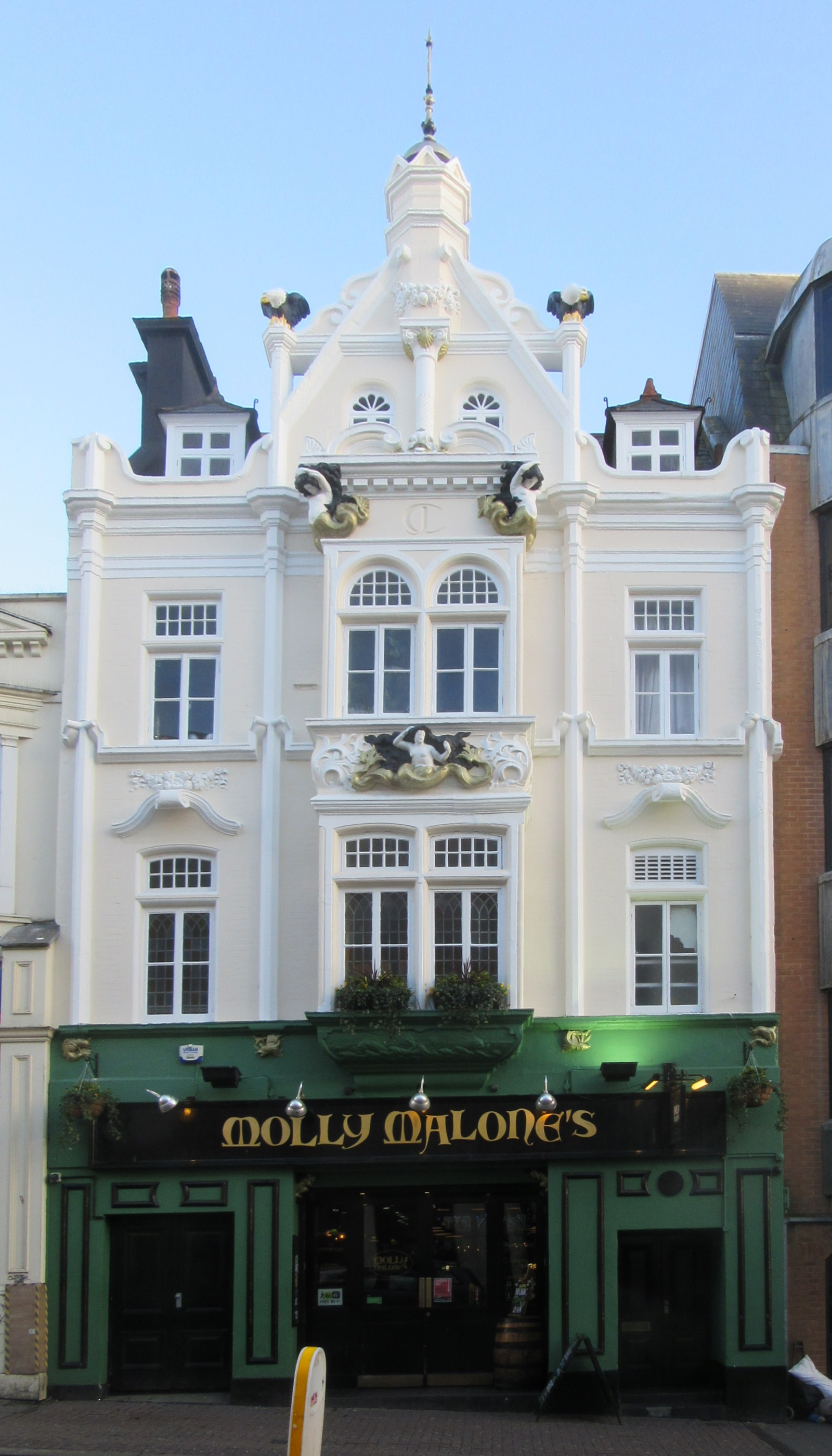
Molly Malone's has locally listed status.

Many pubs in Brighton are listed buildings. The Bath Arms is an early 19th-century house in The Lanes which became a pub later in that century. The Black Horse at Rottingdean is a timber-framed 16th-century building, although much altered. The oldest inn in continuous use in Brighton, the Cricketers Inn, dates from 1545 but was rebuilt in the 17th century, 1790, 1824 and 1886. The Druid's Head Inn, also in The Lanes, was converted from a late 18th-century house. (Note: Its listing particulars, written in 1971, state that it was converted in 1825, but later sources confirm it was licensed as a beerhouse after the passing of the Beerhouse Act 1830.) The Dyke Tavern (1895), Brighton's best example of a Tudor Revival/Arts and Crafts purpose-built pub, closed in 2016 and was listed the following year. The Font (formerly the Font and Firkin) occupies a historic chapel in The Lanes, rebuilt in 1825 by Amon Henry Wilds and Charles Busby on the site of a 17th-century Nonconformist meeting-house. The street-corner building at 83 Gloucester Road in North Laine, now an office, was a pub for many years and retains elaborate decoration on the façade. The Bier Haus, formerly the Jurys Out and the Thurlow Arms, was built in the early 19th century and has the local speciality mathematical tiles on the façade. The historic King and Queen was rebuilt in a fanciful, "striking" Tudor Revival style in the 1930s by local architects Clayton & Black. Two early 19th-century houses were combined in the 20th century to form the Market Inn in The Lanes. The former Montpelier Inn dates from the 1830s, when the surrounding residential area was developing, and retains original features such as sash windows. The Post and Telegraph, a J D Wetherspoon pub, was built as a bank in 1921–1923. The Prince Albert, built in the 1840s, is famous for its Banksy mural and artwork depicting deceased musicians. The Pump House, opened as a pub in 1776 and named after the pump house which fed seawater to one of the local bath-houses, may be older than 18th-century and is faced with mathematical tiles. The Quadrant, a mid-19th-century four-storey building, retains many original internal features. The Regency Tavern dates from the 19th century and stands at the corner of Regency Square. The Royal Pavilion Tavern, close to the site of the former Castle Inn, is an old house which became a hotel and, soon afterwards, a pub in the early 19th century. The Seven Stars on Ship Street, formerly O'Neil's, dates from around 1900 and has an elaborate three-storey façade. The Star Inn in Kemptown expanded to occupy three early 19th-century terraced houses and has a late 19th- or early 20th-century façade. The Sussex Tavern on East Street dates from the 18th century but was extended in the 19th century and has a low tile-hung wing to the rear on Market Street. The Victory Inn is late 19th-century and has a distinctive façade of glazed green tiles and engraved windows, and retains some 19th-century bar fittings.

Several other pubs have locally listed status. Locally listed buildings are defined by Brighton and Hove City Council, which selects them, as "be[ing] of special interest because of their local historic, architectural, design or townscape value". In central Brighton, the Grand Central, Heart and Hand, Hobgoblin, The Joker, Molly Malone's, All Bar One, Queen's Head, Rose Hill Tavern and the former Royal Standard have locally listed status. Inner suburban pubs with this status are the Admiral, the Bear, the Chimney House, the Cleveland Arms, the Fiveways, the Good Companions, the Hollingbury, the Jolly Brewer, the Signalman, the Station Hotel and the former Racehorse Inn. Hanover has the Islingword Inn and the former Horse and Groom and Montreal Arms pubs. The Queen Victoria in the village of Rottingdean, The Downs Hotel on the Woodingdean estate and the Ladies Mile Hotel and the Long Man of Wilmington at Patcham are in outer areas of Brighton. Five of these—the Horse and Groom, Montreal Arms, Rose Hill Tavern, Heart and Hand and Long Man of Wilmington—are former Portsmouth & Brighton United Breweries pubs which have that company's distinctive green tiled façades and leadlights.

From the 1990s, in response to changes in government policy over alcohol licensing, many bank and building society branches were sold for conversion into pubs and bars, and the two city-centre Wetherspoon pubs occupy former bank buildings. The Bright Helm opened in a landmark former Abbey National branch on West Street, and the Post and Telegraph opened in the Grade II-listed former National Provincial (later NatWest) bank at 155–158 North Street in 2010. Close to the latter is a similar conversion: Brighton's branch of the All Bar One chain occupies the former offices of the Brighton Herald newspaper. (Note: It was damaged by fire in November 2020. After reopening in summer 2022, its permanent closure was announced in August 2024, to take effect from the end of that September.) Nearby in Union Street in The Lanes, Brighton's first Nonconformist chapel, Union Chapel, was converted into a pub after its 300 years of religious use ended in the 1980s. Originally owned by the Firkin Brewery and named the Font and Firkin, it is now simply The Font. Opposite this pub is the Bath Arms, converted from a house into a pub in 1864; close by, the Druid's Head was similarly converted in 1825 from an 18th-century house. The Black Horse in Rottingdean is also a conversion: now much altered, it has 16th-century origins and incorporates an old forge.

== Legal aspects ==
The legal ruling that a pub landlord or innkeeper is "responsible for the safety of all property" on the premises, which still applies in English law, was established in 1831 after an incident of theft at an inn in Brighton was taken to the Court of King's Bench.

Some form of regulation for "inns, taverns and ale-houses" has existed in Brighton since 1618 or earlier. From 1872, when the Licensing Act 1872 was passed, until February 2005, licensing of pubs was the responsibility of local magistrates. Since that time Brighton and Hove City Council has been responsible.

== Bibliography ==
- Antram, Nicholas; Morrice, Richard (2008). Brighton and Hove. Pevsner Architectural Guides. London: Yale University Press. ISBN 978-0-300-12661-7.
- Brighton Polytechnic. School of Architecture and Interior Design (1987). A Guide to the Buildings of Brighton. Macclesfield: McMillan Martin. ISBN 1-869-86503-0.
- Carder, Timothy (1990). The Encyclopaedia of Brighton. Lewes: East Sussex County Libraries. ISBN 0-86147-315-9.
- Collis, Rose (2005). Brighton Boozers: a History of the City's Pub Culture. Brighton: Brighton & Hove City Council (Royal Pavilion, Libraries and Museums Department). ISBN 0-948-72360-2.
- Collis, Rose (2010). The New Encyclopaedia of Brighton. (based on the original by Tim Carder) (1st ed.). Brighton: Brighton & Hove Libraries. ISBN 978-0-9564664-0-2.
- Jones, Lavender; Pollard, Jacqueline (1999). Hilly Laine to Hanover: a Brighton Neighbourhood. Brighton: Brighton Books Publishing. ISBN 978-1-901454-04-8.
- Moens, S.M.; Blyth, H.E. (April 1953) [1952]. Rottingdean — The Story of a Village (Coronation ed.). Brighton: John Beal & Son (Stationers).
- Musgrave, Clifford (1981). Life in Brighton. Rochester: Rochester Press. ISBN 0-571-09285-3.
- Robinson, L.J. (1966). The Lanes of Brighton: a Brief Account of the Origins of the Ancient Town of Brighthelmstone. Brighton: The Southern Publishing Co.
