= Royal Pavilion Tavern =

The Fitz Regent
- Royal Pavilion Tavern
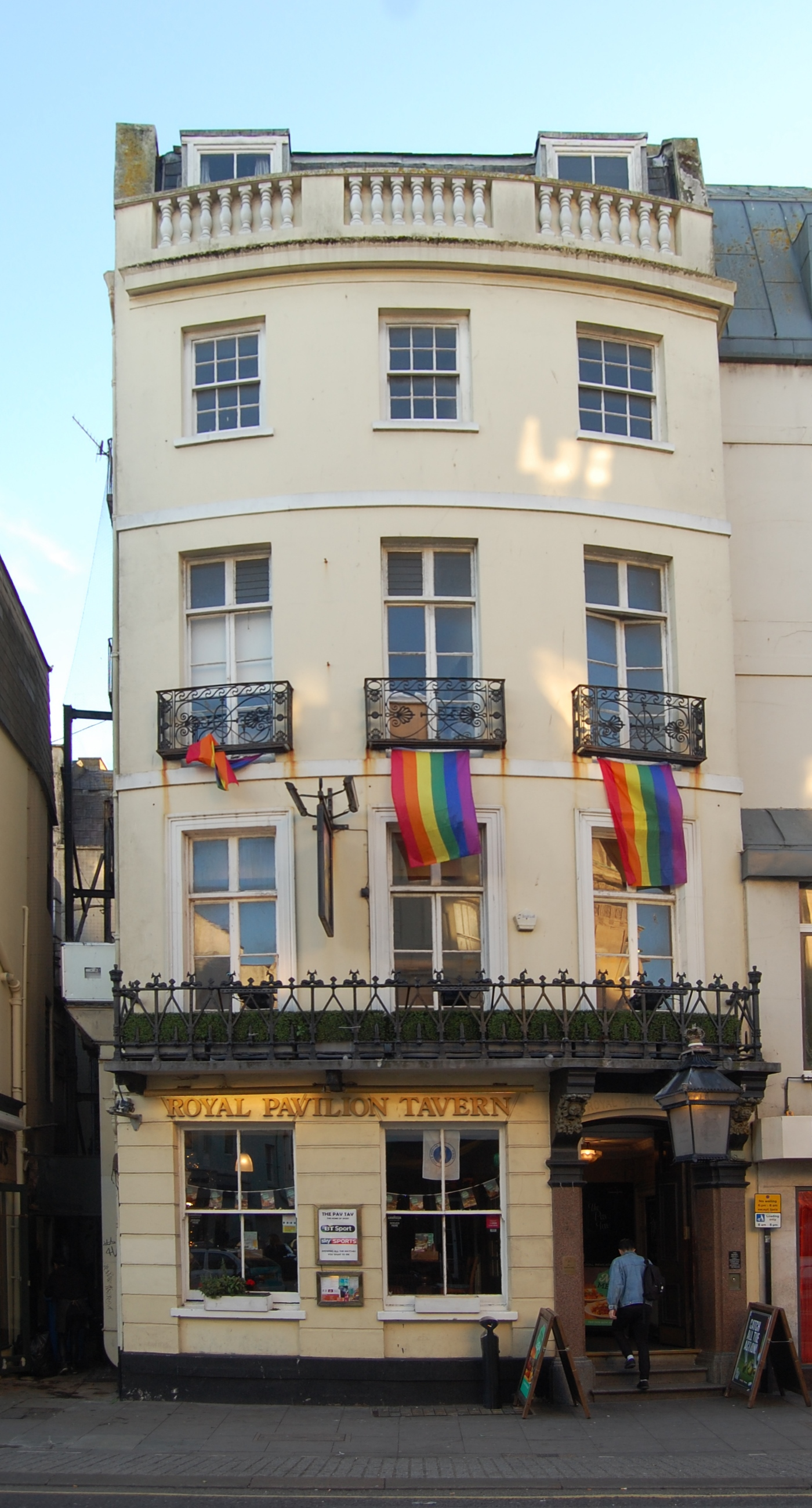
- The building from the north-northeast in September 2018, prior to its renaming

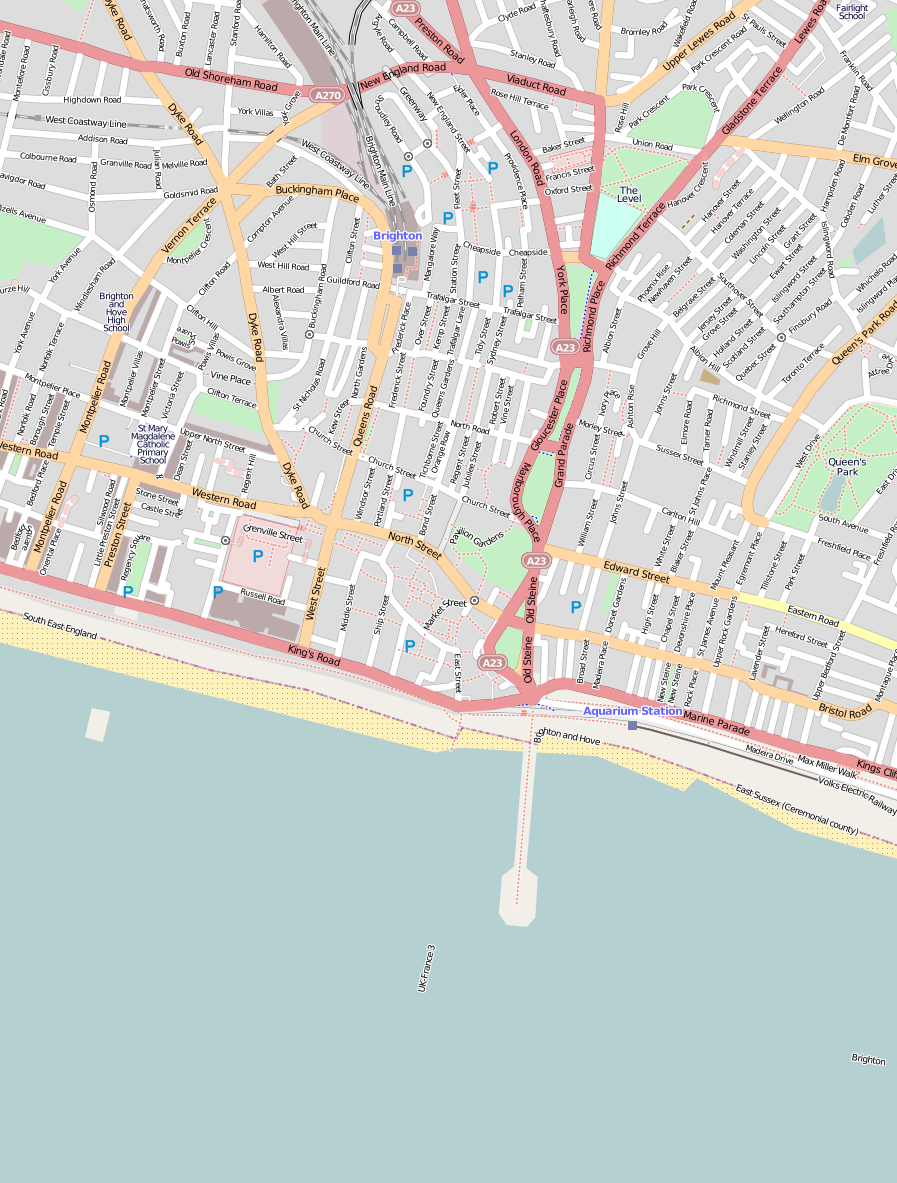
- Location within central Brighton
- 50.8214°N 0.1383°W
- Location: 7–8 Castle Square, Brighton, Brighton and Hove, United Kingdom

History
- Built: Early 19th century

Site notes
- Architectural style: Regency
- Restored: 1820 or 1826
- Restored by: Amon Henry Wilds
- Owner: Mitchells & Butlers
- Website: thefitzregentbrighton.co.uk

Listed Building – Grade II
- Official name: Royal Pavilion Tavern and railings
- Designated: 13 October 1952
- Reference no.: 1380055

The Royal Pavilion Tavern, commonly known as the Pavilion Tavern or Pav Tav and since February 2022 as The Fitz Regent, is a pub in the centre of Brighton, part of the English coastal city of Brighton and Hove. Converted from a house into the Royal Pavilion Hotel in the early 19th century, its original role soon changed from a hotel to a pub, in which guise it remained until its closure in September 2019. It reopened under its new name, but still in the ownership of the Mitchells & Butlers chain, on 13 February 2022. The building was also used as a court for several years early in its history, and prominent local architect Amon Henry Wilds was responsible for its redesign as a hotel and inn. English Heritage has listed the building at Grade II for its architectural and historical importance, and it stands within a conservation area.

== History ==
The fishing and agricultural village of Brighthelmstone, on the Sussex coast in southeast England, grew into the fashionable resort of Brighton from the mid-18th century. Inward investment, good transport links and the popularity of sea-bathing helped it develop "all of the facilities that would have been expected" of an 18th-century leisure destination. One of the most important was the Castle Inn, converted from a house in 1752 by businessman Samuel Shergold. He recognised that the town's wealthy visitors wanted a focal point near the Old Steine—at that time the centre of Brighton's fashionable life—to meet, socialise and stay. It became the nascent resort's most important social venue, especially after an assembly room and ballroom were added. Within 50 years, though, it had declined, and it was demolished in 1823. This allowed the junction of North Street and Old Steine to be widened, and it took the name Castle Square.

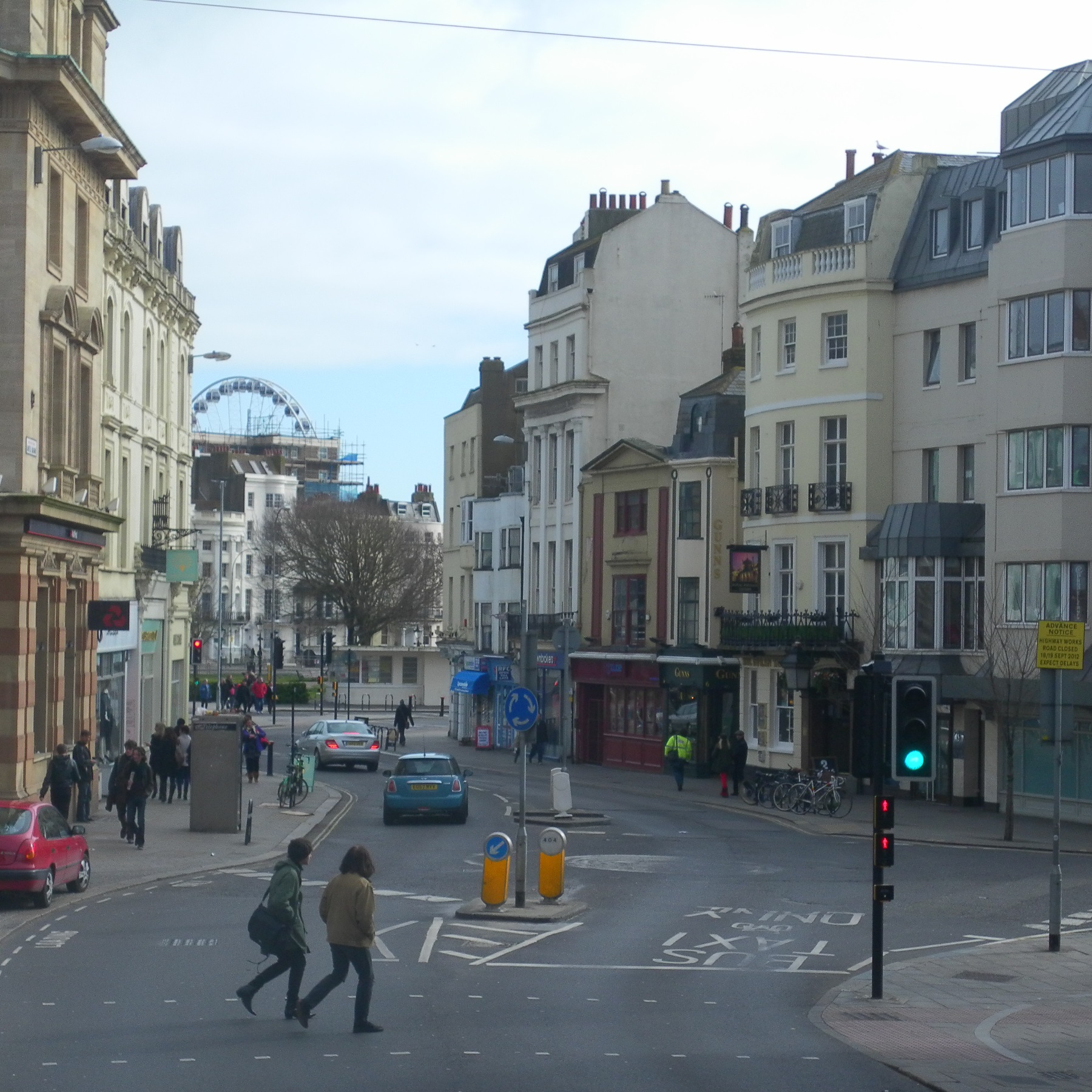
Castle Square has been an important commercial area for centuries. The Royal Pavilion Tavern is on the right.

By 1780, North Street was "the principal commercial street in the town", and Castle Square itself became a hub of commercial activity. Despite the decline of the Castle Inn, the area retained its fashionable air, and by the early 19th century a mixed series of buildings had been built on the southern side; despite some later alterations, their layout and essential character remains. One such building was the tall terraced house at number 8. Dating from early in the 19th century, it soon took on a second role. In 1808, the Court of Whalesbone, a Hundred Court (an early form of magistrates' court) moved from the county town of Lewes to the building. Sessions were held on Mondays, Wednesdays and Fridays. After short interludes at the Old Ship Hotel and Brighton's original Town Hall, the court sessions returned between 1823 and 1832.

By this time, the building had been converted into the Royal Pavilion Hotel. Described as a "family and commercial hotel", it aimed for middle-class customers who would previously have considered the Castle Inn. It may have been established as early as 1816, and certainly by 1820. In that year or in 1826, famous local architect Amon Henry Wilds was commissioned to redesign the building. His partner Charles Busby, who worked with him on many buildings in Brighton in the early 19th century, may have assisted him; the pair also worked on 1a Castle Square around the same time. Wilds gave the hotel a typical Regency stuccoed bow front and an intricate balcony featuring the interlinked dolphins which featured on Brighton's coat of arms.

The building later changed from a hotel to a conventional inn called the Royal Pavilion Tavern. An early proprietor offended Maria Fitzherbert, the Prince Regent's mistress who lived at Steine House (which backed on to the inn), by putting up a sign on the rear wall which read "Gin Palace". After she complained, he altered it to "Shades"—a local term with a similar meaning. That name was recalled in 1991 when the building was substantially refurbished; part of it was converted into a café-bar and restaurant called Shades. A World War II-era bar counter was retrieved from a pub at London Victoria railway station and installed during this refit. The pub was latterly owned and operated by the Mitchells & Butlers chain. On 24 September 2019 the company announced that the pub would close permanently two days later. The building was to be converted for residential use. In August 2021, however, Mitchells & Butlers submitted a planning application to Brighton and Hove City Council proposing alterations and remedial works to the pub. It reopened on 13 February 2022 under its new name, the Fitz Regent, with updated decor in an Art Deco style. Around this time, the owners applied for planning permission to make changes to the interior.

The Royal Pavilion Tavern and the iron railings outside it were listed at Grade II by English Heritage on 13 October 1952. This defines it as a "nationally important" building of "special interest". As of February 2001, it was one of 1,124 Grade II-listed buildings and structures, and 1,218 listed buildings of all grades, in the city of Brighton and Hove. It is also within the Valley Gardens Conservation Area, one of 34 conservation areas in the city of Brighton and Hove. This was designated by Brighton Council in 1973 and covers 92.84 acres (37.57 ha).

== Architecture ==
The buildings on the south side of Castle Square are all of a similar age but show a great variety of sizes and styles. The Royal Pavilion Tavern is one of the taller buildings at four storeys in height. The slate-tiled gambrel roof has dormer windows and is partly hidden behind a balustrade which sits on top of a parapet and cornice. The façade is stuccoed and projects as a segmental-arched bow front. The stucco is rusticated at ground-floor level. The entrance is in the rightmost of the three bays and is flanked by granite pilasters topped by brackets with foliage decoration. Above this, an iron balcony runs across the full width of the building at first-floor level; this dates from the late 19th century and has finials in the form of interlinked dolphins and crowns, recalling the Borough of Brighton's emblem. Each storey has three windows, but they are treated in various ways; those at first-floor level have architraves, the second-storey windows have a small individual iron balcony with anthemion decoration; and those on the top floor have prominent sills.

== See also ==
- Grade II listed buildings in Brighton and Hove: P–R
- Pubs in Brighton
- Media related to Royal Pavilion Tavern, Brighton at Wikimedia Commons
