= Socle (architecture) =

Short plinth used to support a pedestal, sculpture, or column

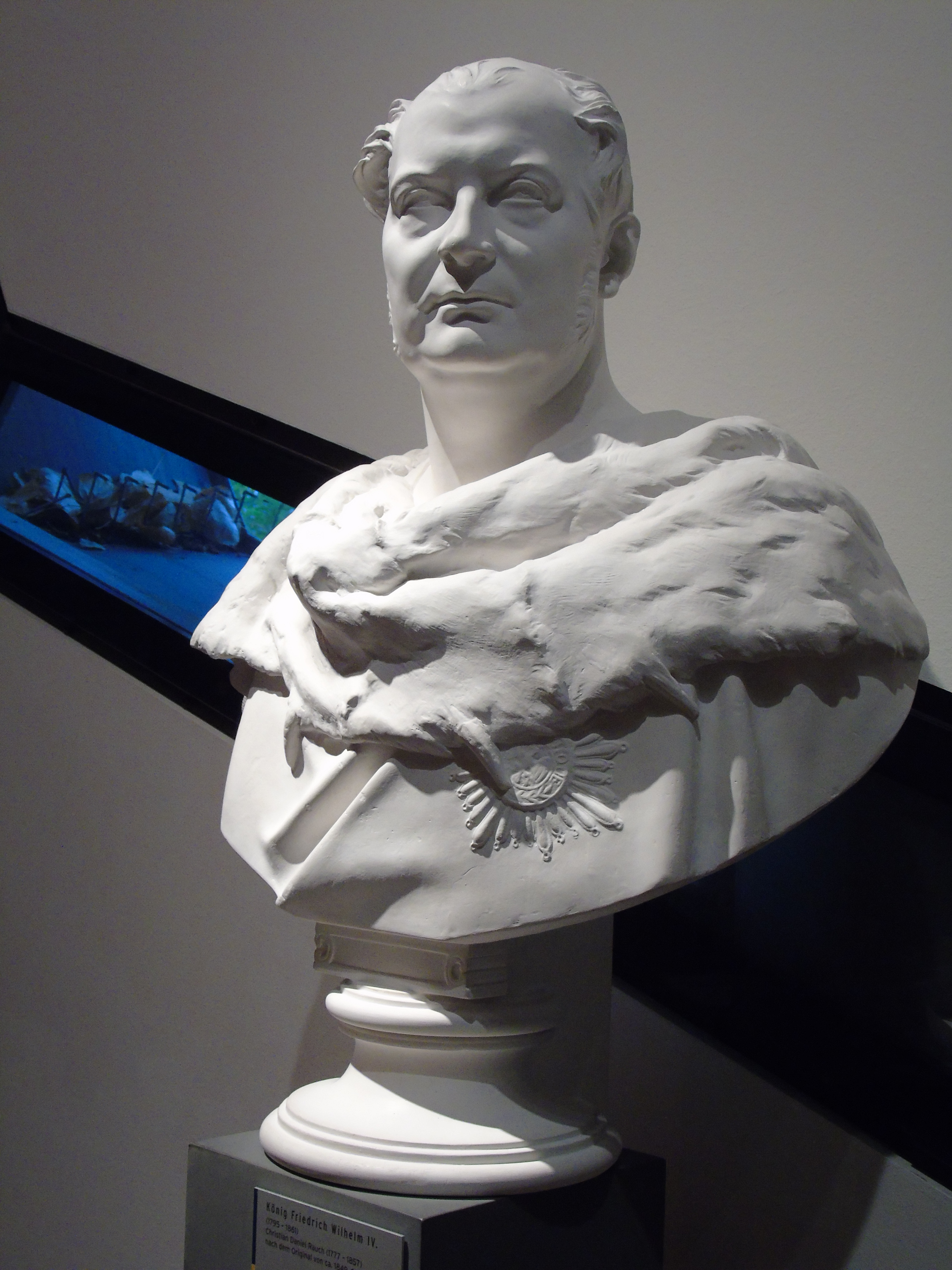
Bust on a round socle

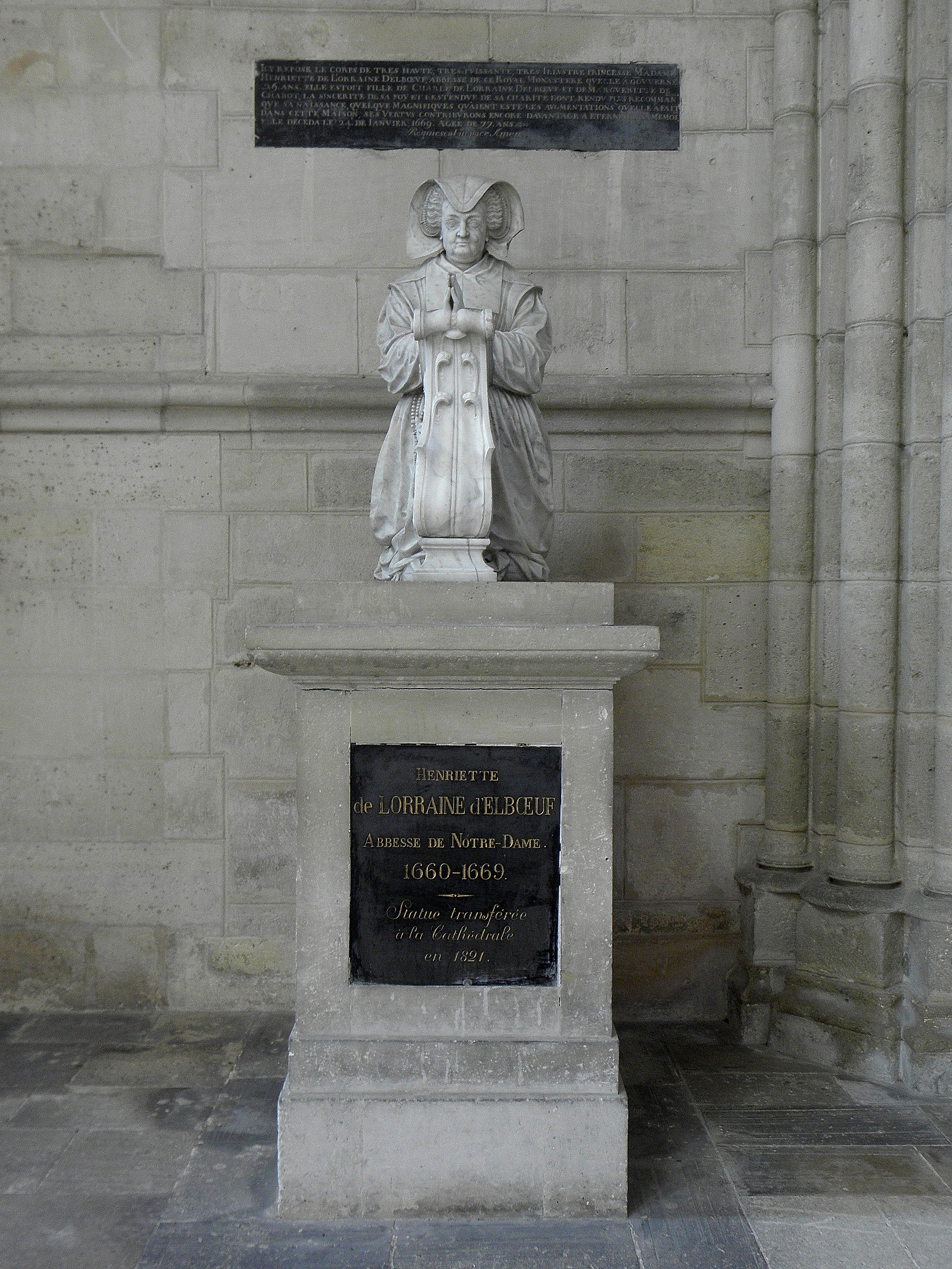
Statue with inscription on what is called the socle in French; more likely the plinth in English.

In architecture, a socle is a short plinth used to support a pedestal, sculpture, or column. In English, the term tends to be most used for the bases for rather small sculptures, with plinth or pedestal preferred for larger examples. This is not the case in French.

In the field of archaeology this term refers to a wall base, frequently of stone, that supports the upper part of the wall, which is made of a different material – frequently mudbrick. This was a typical building practice in ancient Greece, resulting in the frequent preservation of the plans of ancient buildings only in their stone-built lower walls, as at the city of Olynthos. A very early example is the two-storey fortified House of the Tiles at Lerna in the Peloponnese, built of mud-brick over a stone socle, with much use of wood, and clay for the floors and as stucco for the walls. This dates to the Early Helladic II, of four thousand years ago.

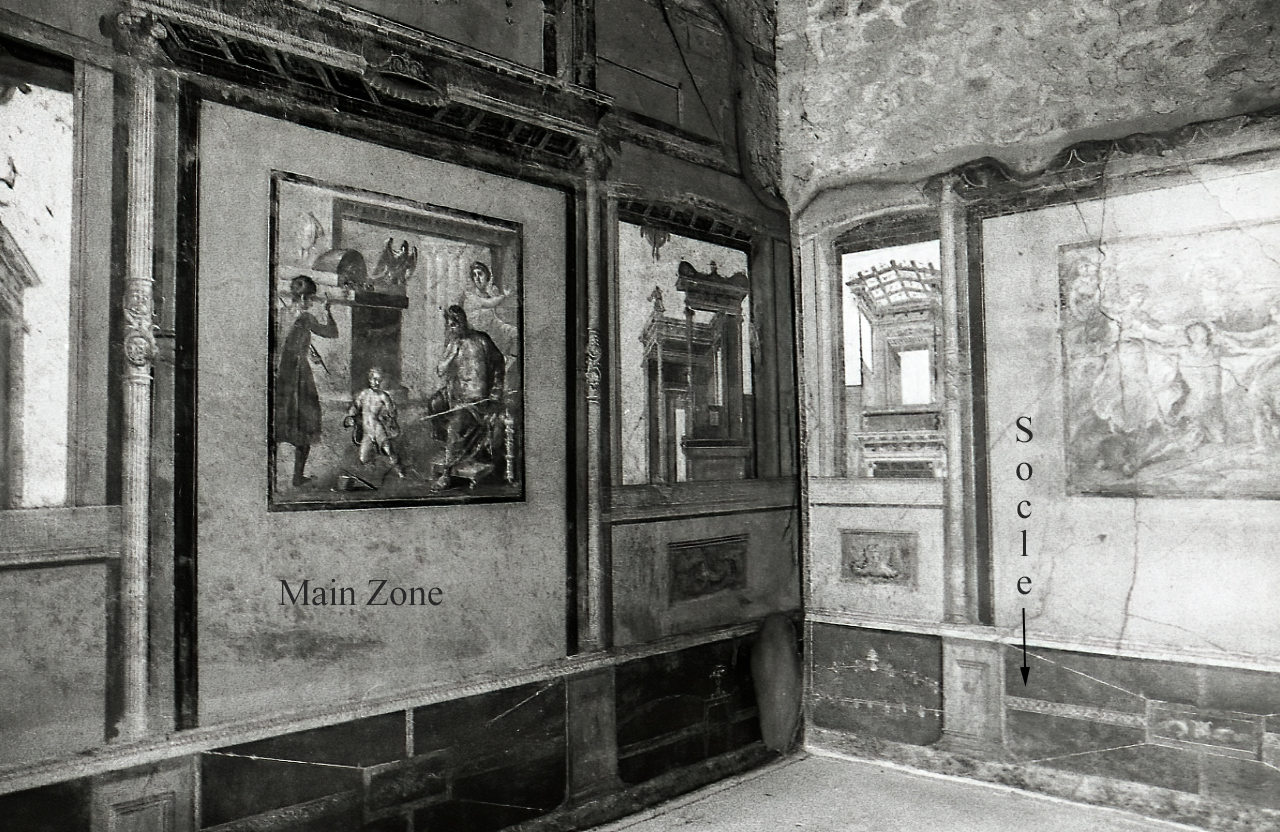
House of the Vetti interior wall sections

In Pompeian interior painting styles, the socle is the lowest zone of wall painting in all four style periods.
