= 20–22 Marlborough Place, Brighton =

Tutto Brighton
- formerly Citizen's House; Allied Irish Bank
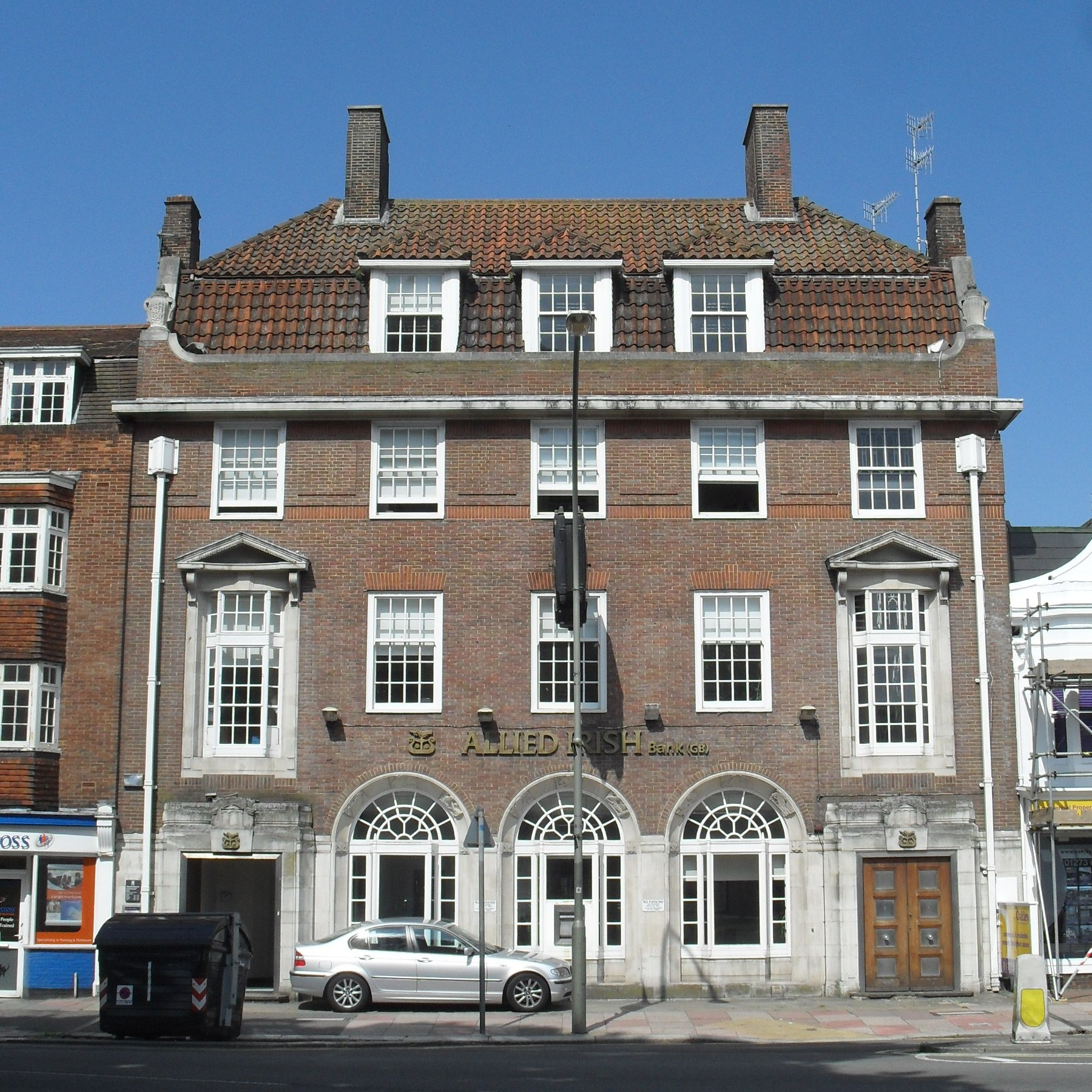
- The building from the east-southeast in 2010, when in use as a branch of Allied Irish Bank

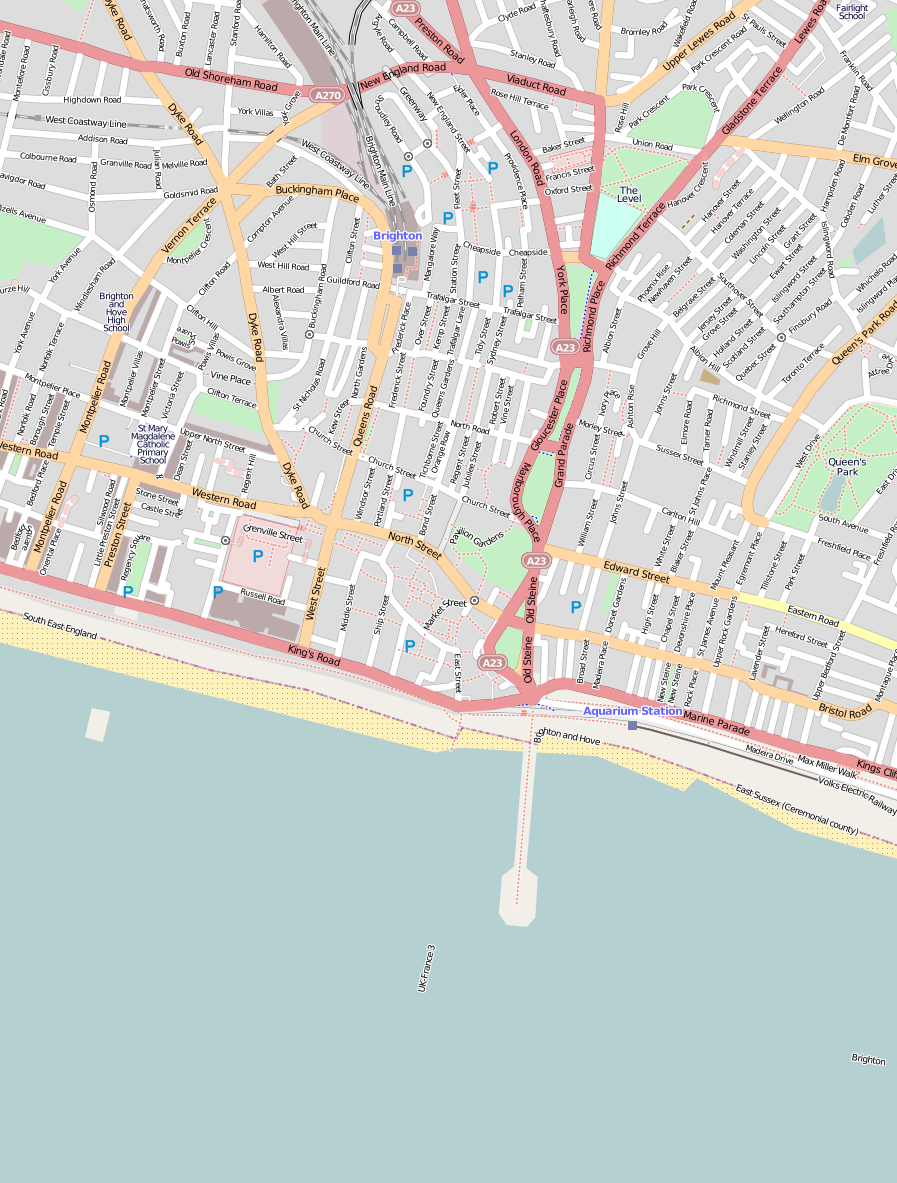
- Location within central Brighton
- 50.8250°N 0.1369°W
- Location: 20–22 Marlborough Place, Brighton BN1 1UB, United Kingdom

History
- Built: 1933
- Built for: Citizens' Permanent Building Society

Site notes
- Architect: John Leopold Denman
- Architectural style: Neo-Georgian

Listed Building – Grade II
- Official name: 20, 21 and 22, Marlborough Place
- Designated: 26 August 1999
- Reference no.: 1381771

The building at 20–22 Marlborough Place in the seaside resort of Brighton, part of the city of Brighton and Hove, is a 1930s office building originally erected for the Citizens' Permanent Building Society. The "elegant" Neo-Georgian premises were later occupied by a branch of the Allied Irish Bank, which opened in the 1980s; and in 2022 it was announced that the premises would be converted into a restaurant. Designed by John Leopold Denman, "master of this sort of mid-century Neo-Georgian", the three-storey offices contrast strikingly with their contemporary neighbour, the elaborate King and Queen pub. The building features a series of carved reliefs by Joseph Cribb depicting workers in the building trade—including one showing Denman himself. It is a Grade II Listed building.

== History ==
Brighton developed into a fashionable resort in the 18th and 19th centuries, with Old Steine as one of its focal points. This was at the southern end of a large area of poorly drained, low-lying open space which later became known as Valley Gardens. The first residential development outside the four-street boundary of the ancient village was in 1771–72, when North Row was built on the west side of the open land. It was renamed Marlborough Place in 1819. One old building was incorporated into the street: a farmhouse which was refronted in the Georgian style and became the King and Queen pub.

The pub and most of the buildings north of it, as far as the junction with Church Street, were redeveloped in the 1930s. One of the plots of land was selected by the Citizen's Permanent Building Society as a site for their headquarters and branch. In 1933, the company commissioned John Leopold Denman to design the building. A local architect, he went into practice in 1909 and designed several buildings in the local area from the 1920s onwards. Considered "a master of the mid-century Neo-Georgian style", he could also handle other styles capably; but he chose Neo-Georgian for his work at Marlborough Place: it offered a "strict contrast" to the gaudy and eclectic King and Queen, rebuilt the previous year by another firm of Brighton architects, Clayton & Black.

The building was ready later that year, and (with the name Citizen's House) it was occupied by the building society for several decades. The Citizen's Permanent merged with another building society, the Regency, in 1963 and became known as the Citizen's Regency Building Society. Another building society, the Brighton and Southern Counties, was absorbed five years later. The Citizen's Regency moved in June 1979 to new premises at Clarence House on North Street, formerly the Clarence Hotel coaching inn, and by the 1980s 20–22 Marlborough Place had been taken over by Allied Irish Bank. It was still in use as their Brighton branch in 2011, but in April 2022 it was stated that it was being converted into an Italian restaurant called Tutto and would be opening in the summer. The opening date of the 70-cover restaurant was later confirmed as 12 September 2022.

== Heritage ==
The offices were designated a Grade II Listed building by English Heritage, the predecessor of Historic England, on 26 August 1999. This status is given to "nationally important buildings of special interest". As of February 2001, it was one of 1,124 Grade II-listed buildings and structures, and 1,218 listed buildings of all grades, in the city of Brighton and Hove.

The building is within the Valley Gardens Conservation Area, one of 34 conservation areas in Brighton and Hove. Brighton & Hove Council described it as a "fine individual building" within a mixed series of structures of various ages which do not form a unified composition, and noted that it fits in well with the older (18th- and 19th-century) buildings in the area because of its "sympathetic scale, massing and proportions". The council considers that should the building ever become vacant, there would be a "strong presumption against [its] demolition" because of its importance in the context of the conservation area.

== Architecture ==
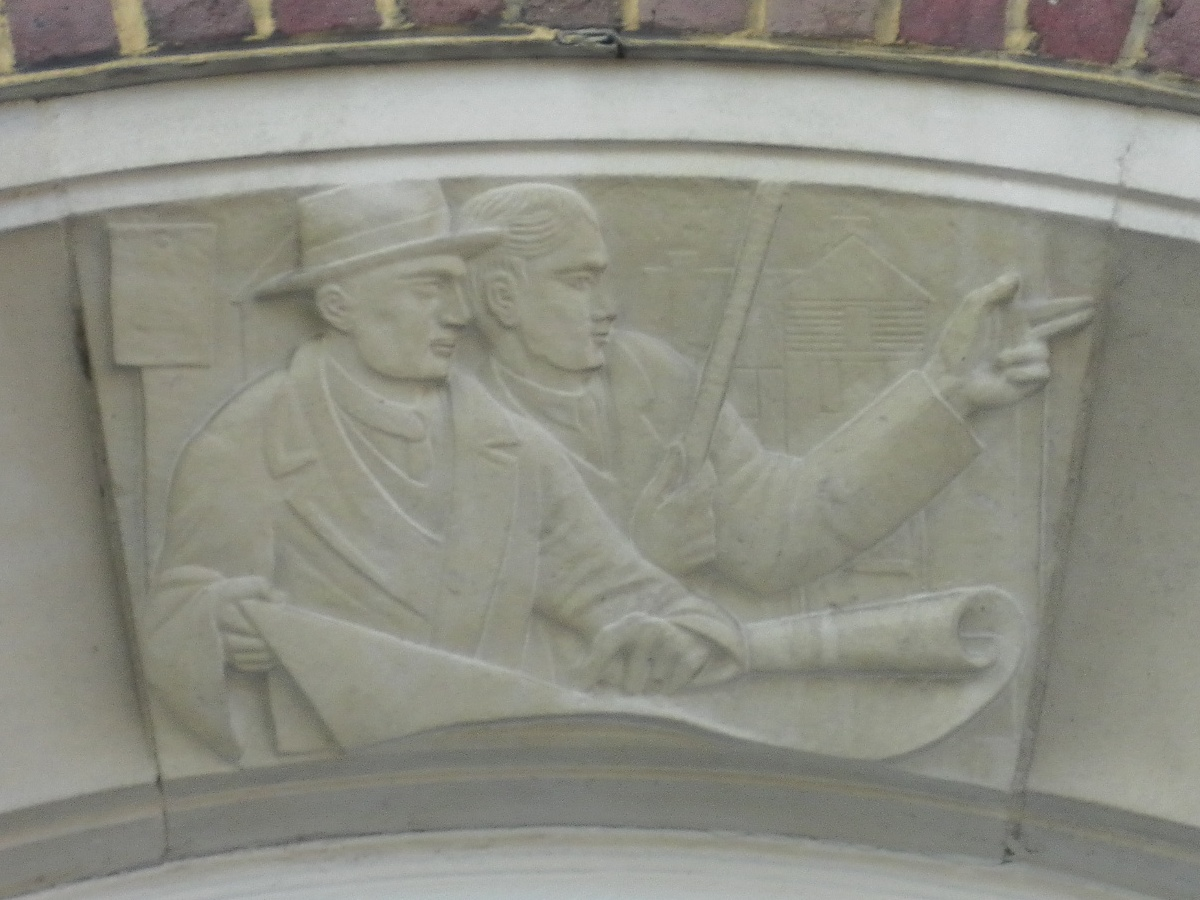
Denman is depicted holding an architectural plan in this relief by Joseph Cribb above one of the ground-floor windows.

Denman designed the building in a "well-mannered but individual Neo-Georgian style". The walls are of red brick with some Portland stonework. The brickwork is laid in the stretcher bond pattern. The roof, in which there is attic space, is laid with pantiles. The façade is symmetrical, consisting of five bays each with one window on the first and second floors. At ground-floor level, there are entrances in the outermost bays flanking three large round-headed windows, all recessed into a slightly projecting stone-faced section. The windows above the entrances are taller than the others and have pediments above them supported on corbels. The other windows are plain sashes, although those at second-floor level have bands and panels of brick around them. Below the attic storey is a stone cornice topped by a brick parapet with decorative urns at each end. The mansard roof, in which three dormer windows are set, "gives a Scandinavian air". An elaborate clock with a decorative case projects prominently from the façade at first-floor level.

The "elegant" building is distinguished by a series of carved reliefs in the architraves of the arched ground-floor windows. They depict aspects of the building trade in the form of three workers undertaking construction activity. On the left window, a hat-wearing John Leopold Denman is shown with a set of architectural plans, in discussion with another man. Other reliefs include a flat cap-wearing man laying bricks and a man sawing a piece of wood. They were carved by Joseph Cribb, a long-time collaborator with Denman who was working with him at the same time on the offices of the Brighton & Hove Herald newspaper at 2–3 Pavilion Buildings, a short distance away. The carvings are in good condition with "no overall risk" of deterioration.

== See also ==
- Grade II listed buildings in Brighton and Hove: M
- Media related to Reliefs at 20–22 Marlborough Place, Brighton at Wikimedia Commons

== Bibliography ==
- Antram, Nicholas; Morrice, Richard (2008). Brighton and Hove. Pevsner Architectural Guides. London: Yale University Press. ISBN 978-0-300-12661-7.
- Brighton Polytechnic. School of Architecture and Interior Design (1987). A Guide to the Buildings of Brighton. Macclesfield: McMillan Martin. ISBN 1-869865-03-0.
- Brodie, Antonia (2001). British Architectural Library (Royal Institute of British Architects) Directory of British Architects 1834–1914: A–K. Vol. 1. London: Continuum. ISBN 0-8264-5513-1.
- Carder, Timothy (1990). The Encyclopaedia of Brighton. Lewes: East Sussex County Libraries. ISBN 0-86147-315-9.
