= 2–3 Pavilion Buildings, Brighton =

2–3 Pavilion Buildings
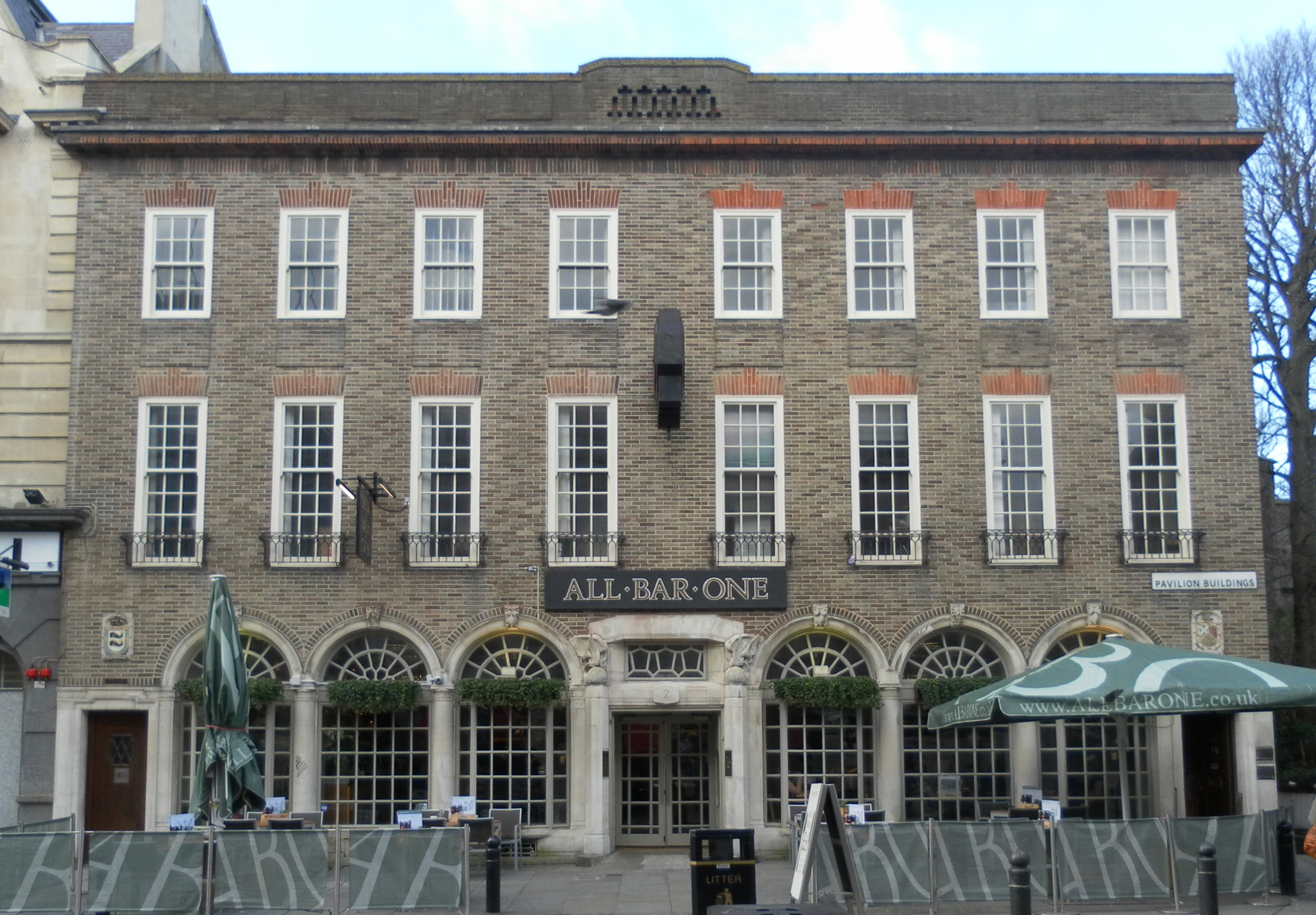
- The building from the east

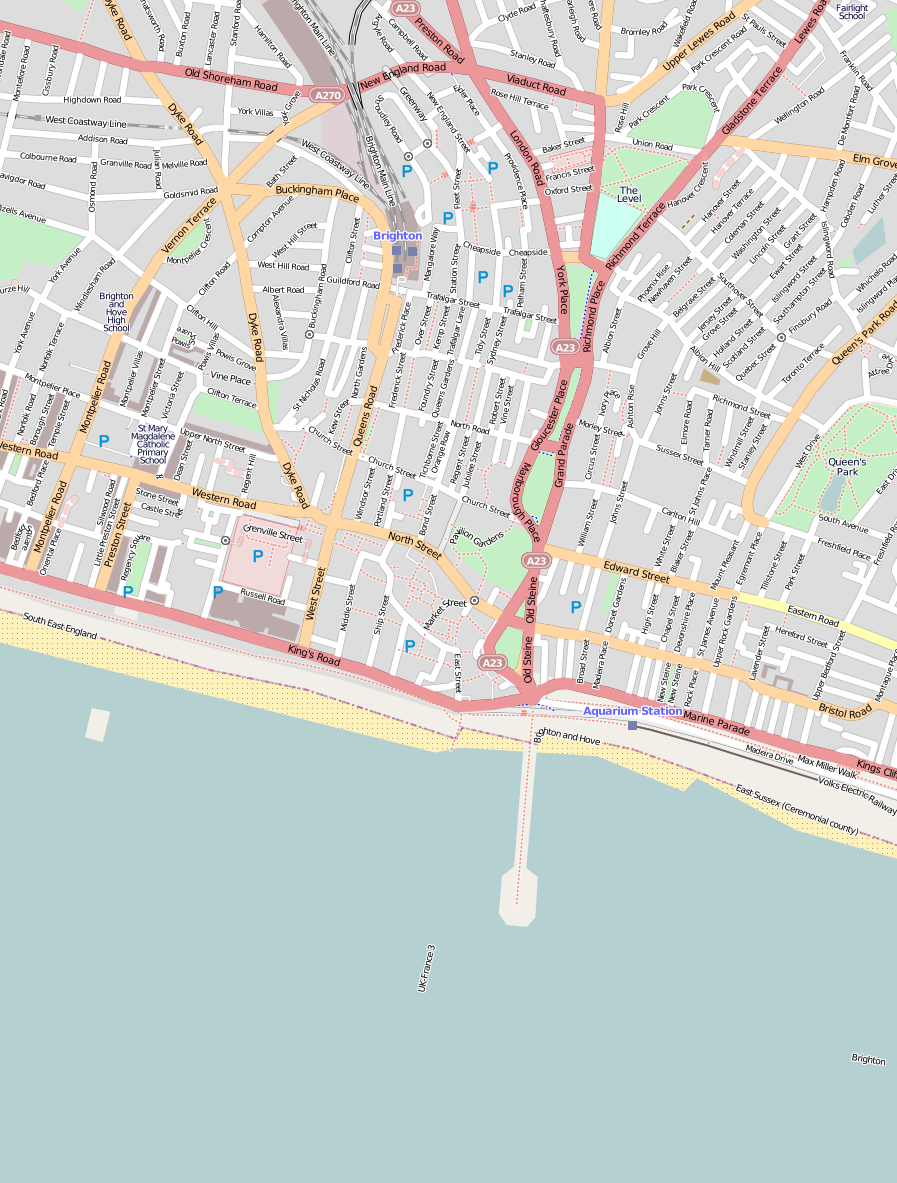
- Location within Brighton

General information
- Status: Completed
- Type: Offices (now bar)
- Architectural style: Neo-Georgian
- Location: Brighton and Hove, United Kingdom
- Coordinates: 50.8222°N 0.1385°W
- Construction started: 1933
- Completed: 1934
- Owner: Mitchells & Butlers

Technical details
- Floor count: 3

Design and construction
- Architect: John Leopold Denman

2–3 Pavilion Buildings in Brighton is a former office building which has been converted into The North Star pub . It was constructed in 1934 as the new head office of the Brighton & Hove Herald, a "leading provincial weekly" newspaper serving the borough and seaside resort of Brighton and its neighbour Hove in southeast England. The Neo-Georgian offices were built to the design of prolific local architect John Leopold Denman and feature decorative carvings by Joseph Cribb. After production of the Herald ceased in the 1970s, the building was used by an insurance company and then as a bar. A firm of insolvency practitioners also occupies part of the premises. Vestigial remains of the neighbouring Royal Pavilion's guest bedrooms were incorporated into the building's rear elevation. The building is on Brighton and Hove City Council's Local List of Heritage Assets and is in a conservation area.

== History ==
Pavilion Buildings leads northwards from Castle Square (the "commercial hub of the town from the late 18th century") to the southern edge of the Royal Pavilion estate. The Pavilion was built as a house for the Prince of Wales and later transformed into a royal palace upon his accession to the throne as King George IV. His successor King William IV commissioned new buildings at the south end of the estate in 1831, including offices, servants' quarters and guest bedrooms. These were mostly demolished in 1851–52, and Pavilion Buildings was laid out as a road leading from Castle Square to the South Lodge of the Pavilion grounds.

In 1933, the owners of the Brighton & Hove Herald newspaper bought the land at the northwest end of Pavilion Buildings, closest to the Royal Pavilion's grounds, as the site of a new head office. The newspaper, Brighton's oldest, was founded in 1806 at Middle Street and later moved to offices in Prince's Place near the Chapel Royal. Originally known as the Brighton Herald, it became the Brighton Herald & Hove Chronicle in 1902 and took the name Brighton & Hove Herald in 1922. The site had been occupied by the Pavilion's guest bedrooms, and parts of the yellow brick, flint and cobblestone walls were left standing and were incorporated into the rear of the new offices.

John Leopold Denman was commissioned to design the building in 1933. Born in Brighton, he designed a wide range of commercial and civic buildings, churches, pubs and hotels in the town and elsewhere in Sussex. Described as "the master of ... mid-century Neo-Georgian", he designed three buildings in nearby streets in that style around the same time—20–22 Marlborough Place, the Richmond Hotel and Regent House—and adopted the same style in his work at Pavilion Buildings. The offices were completed in 1934 (Note: Some sources state that the building dates from 1932.) and were used by the Brighton & Hove Herald until the newspaper merged with the Brighton & Hove Gazette in 1971. By 1987 the premises were known as the Royal Insurance Building and were used as offices by the Royal Insurance Company. In the 21st century the ground floor has operated as a bar: by 2010 it was the Ha! Ha! Bar & Canteen, a chain pub owned by Yates Group, and it was later owned by Mitchells & Butlers and traded under their All Bar One brand. The Brighton office of insolvency practitioner Begbies Traynor is also based in the building.

The interior of the building was severely damaged by fire in November 2020. The bar was not open at the time because of the COVID-19 lockdown in England. After refurbishment it reopened in summer 2022; but in August 2024 it was announced that All Bar One would be vacating the building at the end of September, at which point the whole premises, including the leased offices on the first and second floors, were to be marketed for sale for £2.65 million. It was stated that the ground-floor bar and basement could be rented out separately as an alternative. In March 2025 it was bought by Team Domenica, a charity for people with learning disabilities, which stated its intention to turn the upper floors into a base for its specialist training centre and to use the ground floor as a café-bar which would employ people helped by the charity.

The building features prominently in the 1965 film Be My Guest, sequel to Live It Up!, in which the main character Dave gets a job at the Brighton Herald.

== Heritage ==
The building is within the Valley Gardens Conservation Area, one of 34 conservation areas in the city of Brighton and Hove. The 92.84-acre (37.57 ha) area was designated by Brighton Borough Council in 1973 and has been extended several times since.

The building was included in Brighton Borough Council's local list of heritage assets, which was adopted in 1987. After Brighton amalgamated with neighbouring Hove to form Brighton and Hove Borough (later City) Council, this list was combined with Hove Borough's local list. Buildings with this designation are "identified as having a degree of significance meriting consideration in planning decisions, because of [their] heritage interest". The city council reassessed all locally listed buildings in 2015; 2–3 Pavilion Buildings was retained on the list. The Council considers that it "contributes positively to the area and the approach to the Royal Pavilion" and is a "good example" of an interwar commercial building and of the work of John Leopold Denman.

== Architecture ==
2–3 Pavilion Buildings is a "very stylish and well-detailed" Neo-Georgian building by John Leopold Denman, produced during a prolific period of the mid-1930s when he was responsible for several similar buildings in Brighton. The three-storey building is constructed of handmade brown and red bricks and Portland stone and has a symmetrical façade with eight bays to the upper storeys and nine at ground-floor level. The latter has a central entrance recessed under a flat-arched doorway with a glazed tympanum is flanked by an arcade of three "attractive" and "delicate" round-arched timber bow windows on each side, also with glazed tympana, and further entrances in the outermost bays. Above one of these outer doors is a plaque displaying the coat of arms of the Borough of Brighton; above the other is the coat of arms of the Borough of Hove. At first- and second-floor level are eight equally spaced sash windows. The roof is behind a parapet, below which is a projecting cornice. A clock projects over the central entrance at first-floor level.

Joseph Cribb designed a series of carvings on the outside walls—principally the "delightful" acanthus capitals with tiny seahorse and scallop designs. The reliefs are carved in Portland stone and are in good condition. (Note: According to the criteria set by Public Sculptures of Sussex, a project administered by the University of Brighton and the Public Monuments and Sculpture Association.) Cribb also worked with Denman on the offices at nearby 20–22 Marlborough Place (1933), where the window surrounds are adorned with carvings.

== See also ==
- Pubs in Brighton

== Bibliography ==
- Antram, Nicholas; Morrice, Richard (2008). Brighton and Hove. Pevsner Architectural Guides. London: Yale University Press. ISBN 978-0-300-12661-7.
- Brighton Polytechnic. School of Architecture and Interior Design (1987). A Guide to the Buildings of Brighton. Macclesfield: McMillan Martin. ISBN 1-869-86503-0.
- Carder, Timothy (1990). The Encyclopaedia of Brighton. Lewes: East Sussex County Libraries. ISBN 0-861-47315-9.
- Collis, Rose (2010). The New Encyclopaedia of Brighton. (based on the original by Tim Carder) (1st ed.). Brighton: Brighton & Hove Libraries. ISBN 978-0-9564664-0-2.
- Dale, Antony (1976). Brighton Town and Brighton People. Chichester: Phillimore & Co. Ltd. ISBN 0-85033-219-2.
- Musgrave, Clifford (1981). Life in Brighton. Rochester: Rochester Press. ISBN 0-571-09285-3.
- Various authors (2002). Kiss & Kill: Film Visions of Brighton. Brighton: Brighton and Hove City Council (Royal Pavilion, Museums & Libraries department). ISBN 0-948723-49-1.
