= St Peter's Church, Brighton =

Church in East Sussex, England

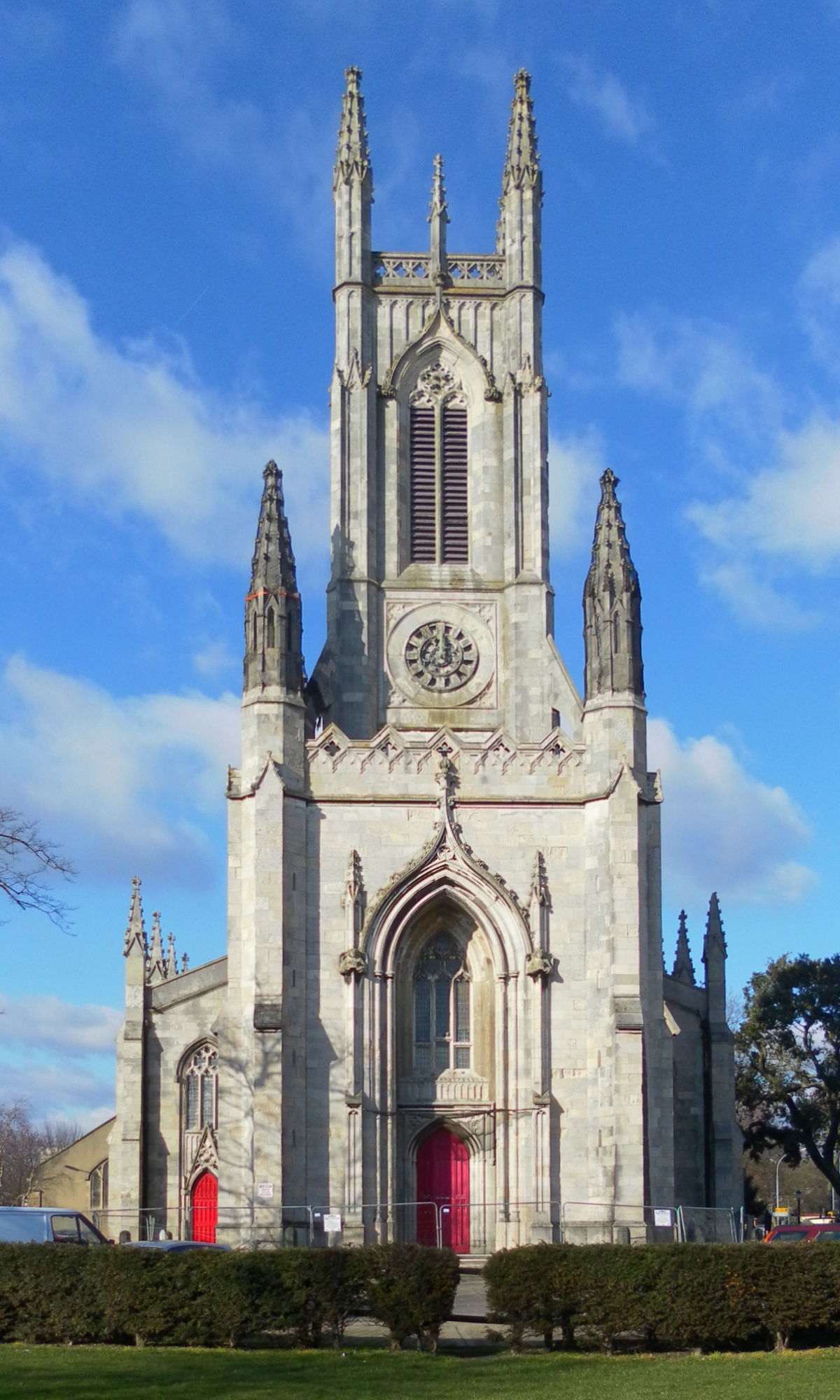
- Church from the liturgical west
- St Peter's Church, Brighton
- 50°49′42.11″N 0°8′5.98″W
- Denomination: Church of England
- Churchmanship: Evangelical
- Website: http://www.stpetersbrighton.org

History
- Dedication: Saint Peter

Specifications
- Height: 41 m (135 ft)

Administration
- Province: Canterbury
- Diocese: Chichester
- Archdeaconry: Chichester
- Deanery: Brighton
- Parish: Brighton, St Peter

Clergy
- Vicar: Daniel Millest

St Peter's Church is a church in Brighton in the English city of Brighton and Hove. It is near the centre of the city, on an island between two major roads, the A23 London Road and A270 Lewes Road. Built from 1824–28 to a design by Sir Charles Barry, it is arguably the finest example of the pre-Victorian Gothic Revival style. It is a Grade II* listed building. It was the parish church of Brighton from 1873 to 2007 and is sometimes unofficially referred to as "Brighton's cathedral".

== History ==
St Peter's Church was founded as a chapel of ease associated with Brighton's oldest church and its existing parish church, St Nicholas. The contract to design the new church was won in open competition by Charles Barry, then only in his mid-twenties. It was built in an approximation of the 14th- and 15th-century Perpendicular or Late Gothic style, typical of the so-called Commissioners' churches, of which St Peter's was one. It was not a revival of its style in the manner of Barry's pupil Augustus Pugin, but, as Nikolaus Pevsner described it, remedies this fault by remarkable inventiveness and boldness.

The foundation stone was laid by the Vicar of Brighton, the Revd R. J. Carr, on 8 May 1824, at a location which was at the time "the entrance to the town" but which is now in the city centre, following the rapid development of Brighton since that date. The ceremony of consecration was led by the same man on 25 January 1828.

A spire was designed by Barry in 1841, but it was never built. The side aisles originally had galleries (such as those to be seen at churches such as Christ Church, Spitalfields), but these were taken down, as were so many, as a result of the cultural and liturgical changes made in the wake of the Oxford Movement.

Barry's hexagonal apse was demolished in 1898 to make way for a much larger, straight-ended chancel designed by Somers Clarke and J. T. Mickelthwaite, built-in Sussex sandstone, its warm hue contrasting with the cold, white appearance of the Portland stone in which the rest of the church was built. The building work continued until 1906. The new chancel, 53 feet (16 m) long and 35 feet (11 m) wide, was consecrated in the presence of the then Archbishop of Canterbury, the Most Reverend Randall Thomas Davidson.

The church has a selection of stained-glass windows, most of which are by Charles Eamer Kempe. The liturgical east side (geographical north) has a window commemorating Queen Victoria, presented to the church on behalf of the people of Brighton using funds raised in the town. The Church also contains reredos panels by the artist and designer Edward Arthur Fellowes Prynne.

St Peter's was listed at Grade II* on 24 March 1950. It is one of 72 Grade II* listed buildings, and 1,220 listed buildings of all grades, in the city of Brighton and Hove.

St Peter's parish was legally united with that of the Chapel Royal in North Street from 25 July 1978 by means of an Order in Council.

== HTB church plant ==
In December 2007, after a long period of consultation, the Diocesan Pastoral Committee recommended to the Church Commissioners that St Peter's should be made redundant. However, on 8 May 2009, Holy Trinity Brompton Church in London, an influential Church of England parish church which created the Alpha course, agreed to take over its ownership and running. St Peter's previously merged parish with that of the Chapel Royal was reconstituted as a separate and smaller parish.

Services restarted on Sunday, 1 November 2009. The vicar at the time was Archie Coates and the associate vicar was Jonny Gumbel (the son of Nicky Gumbel who developed the Alpha Course). Since then, the church has grown to "more than 1000" and continues to grow under new vicar Daniel Millest (appointed September 2022). It has a focus on social action, especially through a project known as Safehaven to help homeless people. There are three services on a Sunday: a liturgical Holy Communion at 8:00 am, a family service at 10:30, and a student and youth-oriented service at 6:30 pm. St Peter's has a satellite church on the Whitehawk estate, known as St Cuthman's, and has also planted a church in Holy Trinity Church, Hastings. In August 2016, the vicar and 30 parishioners moved to Portsmouth to start Harbour Church, a church plant in the city centre "aimed specifically at students and young adults."

== Organ ==
St Peter's had a large pipe organ built-in 1888 for the Hampstead Conservatoire of Music by Henry Willis and brought to Brighton in 1910. It is the sole survivor of three almost identical instruments in the town, the others having been at the Dome Pavilion and in Hove Town Hall. The latter is now at Haberdashers' Aske's Boys' School in Elstree, while the former was broken up in the 1930s. It is almost identical to the famous organ in Cathedral of the Blessed Virgin Mary, Truro.

At a meeting of the Diocesan Advisory Committee held on 14 March 2019, it was proposed that the organ be removed from St Peter's and installed in St John's College Chapel, Cambridge. The organ has now been removed from St Peter's.

The organ features in a recording made in June 1977 when the Choir of Guildford Cathedral gave a concert at St Peter's. Louis Vierne's Organ Symphony No.1 (Prelude) demonstrates the impressive Swell to good effect.

== Bells ==
The tower of St Peter's currently houses 10 bells, all of which were cast in 1914 by Mears and Stainbank of London. The tenor bell weighs 25-2-0 cwt and is tuned to the key of D. The bells hang in a cast-iron frame on two levels, bells 1, 2 and 9 hang on the upper level. This ring of 10 replaces an earlier ring of 8 and were given to the church by John Thornton-Rickman.

Following a period of silence while work was carried out on the tower, the bells rang out for the first time in almost three years on Sunday 18 December 2022.

== Photo gallery ==
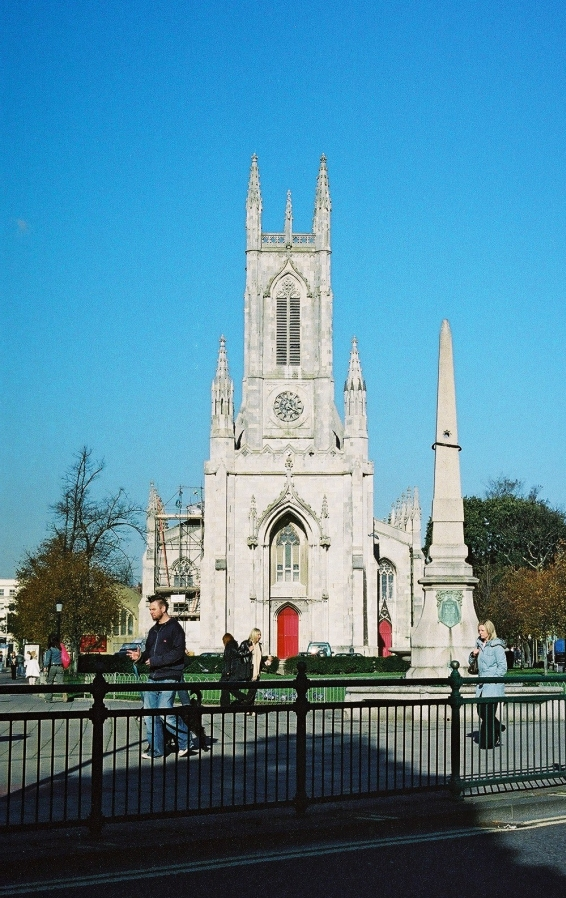
West end and War Memorial

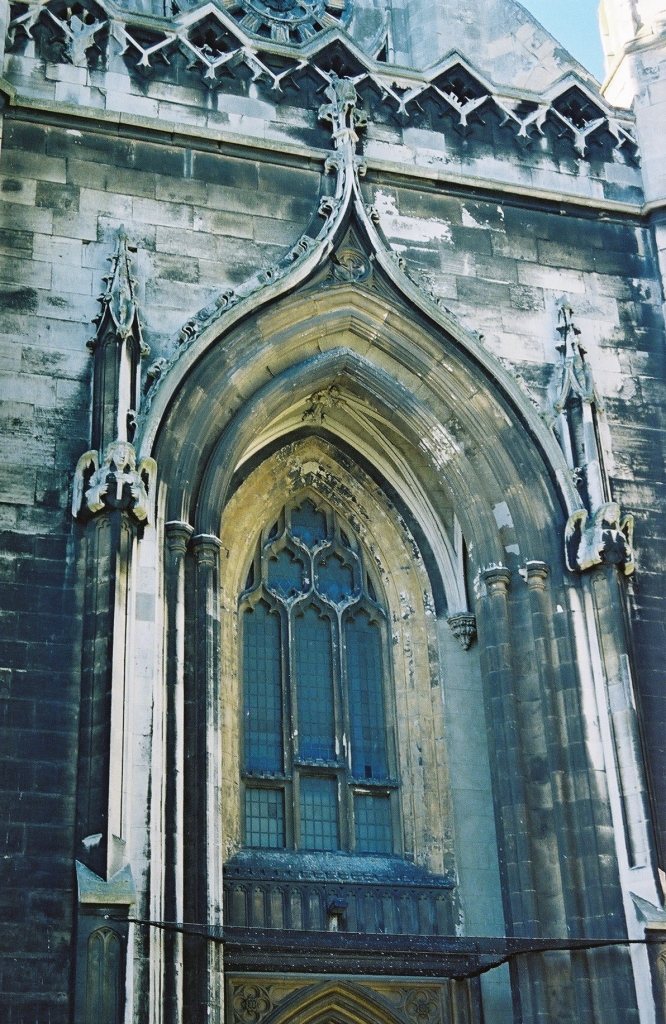
Arch in the liturgical west face of the tower

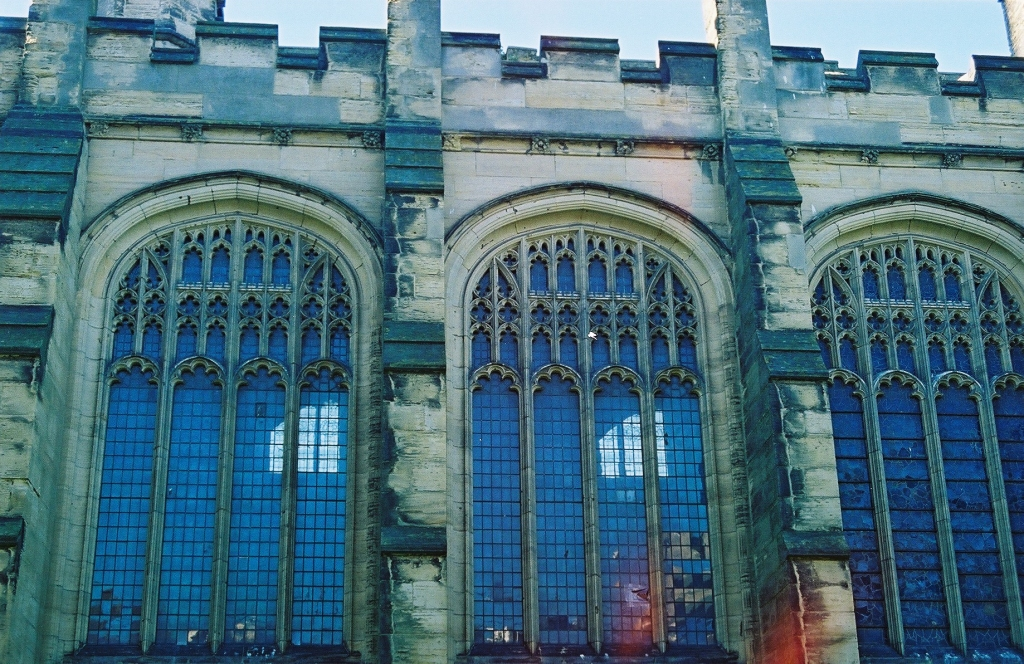
Windows on the liturgical south side of the later chancel

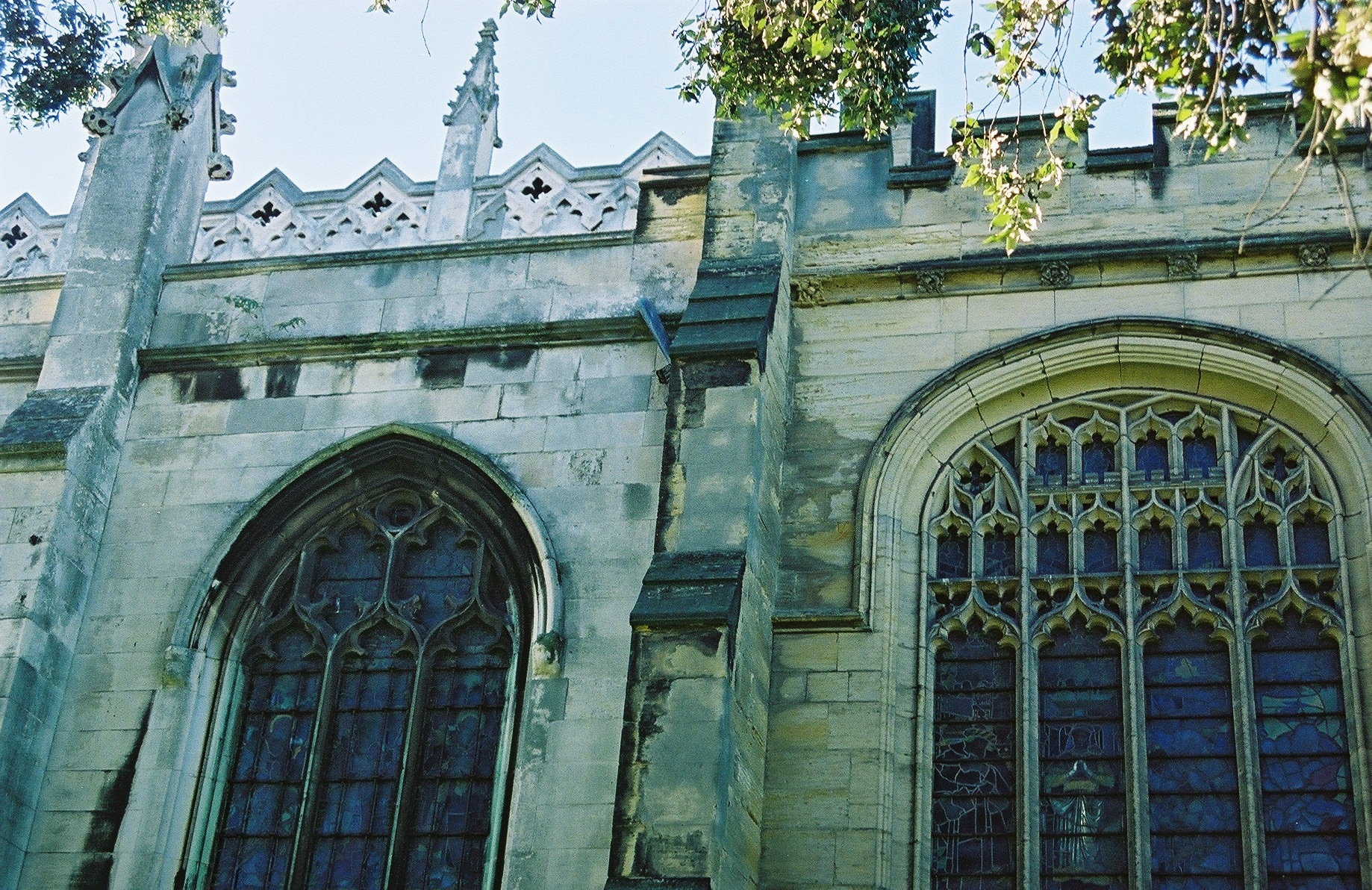
Windows on the liturgical south side, the one on the left in the original nave, the one on the right in the later chancel

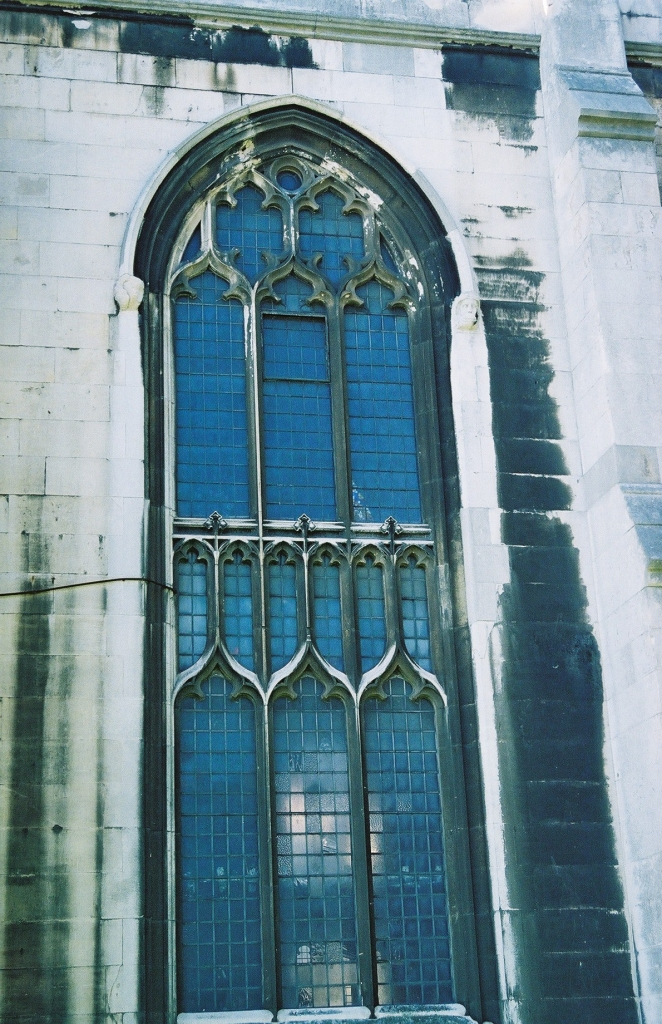
Window on the liturgical south side of the original nave

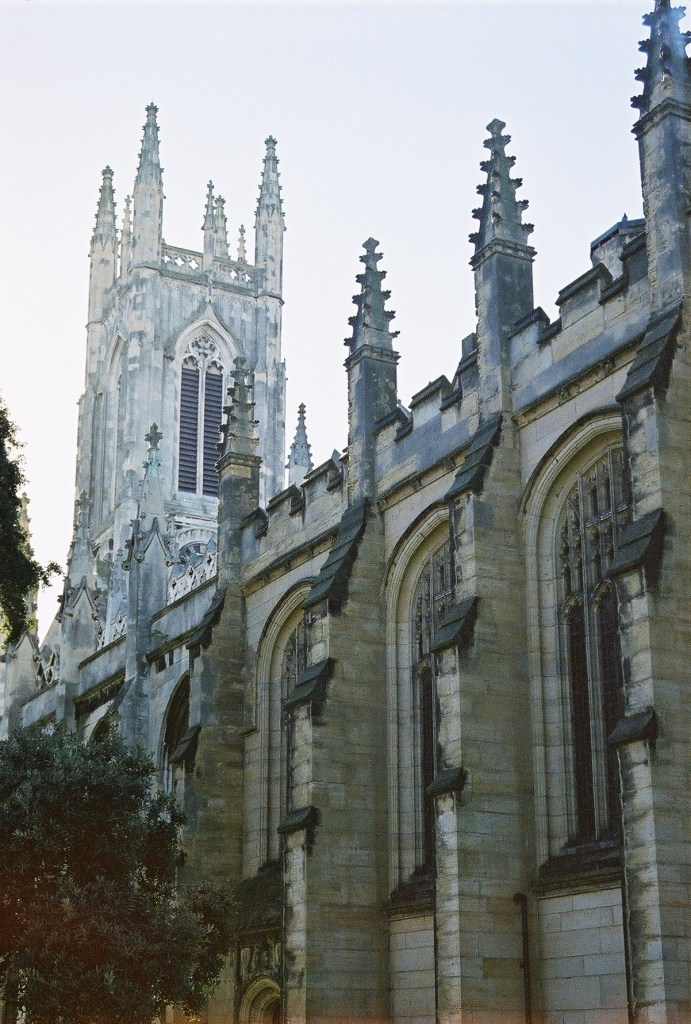
Looking across the church from the liturgical south-east

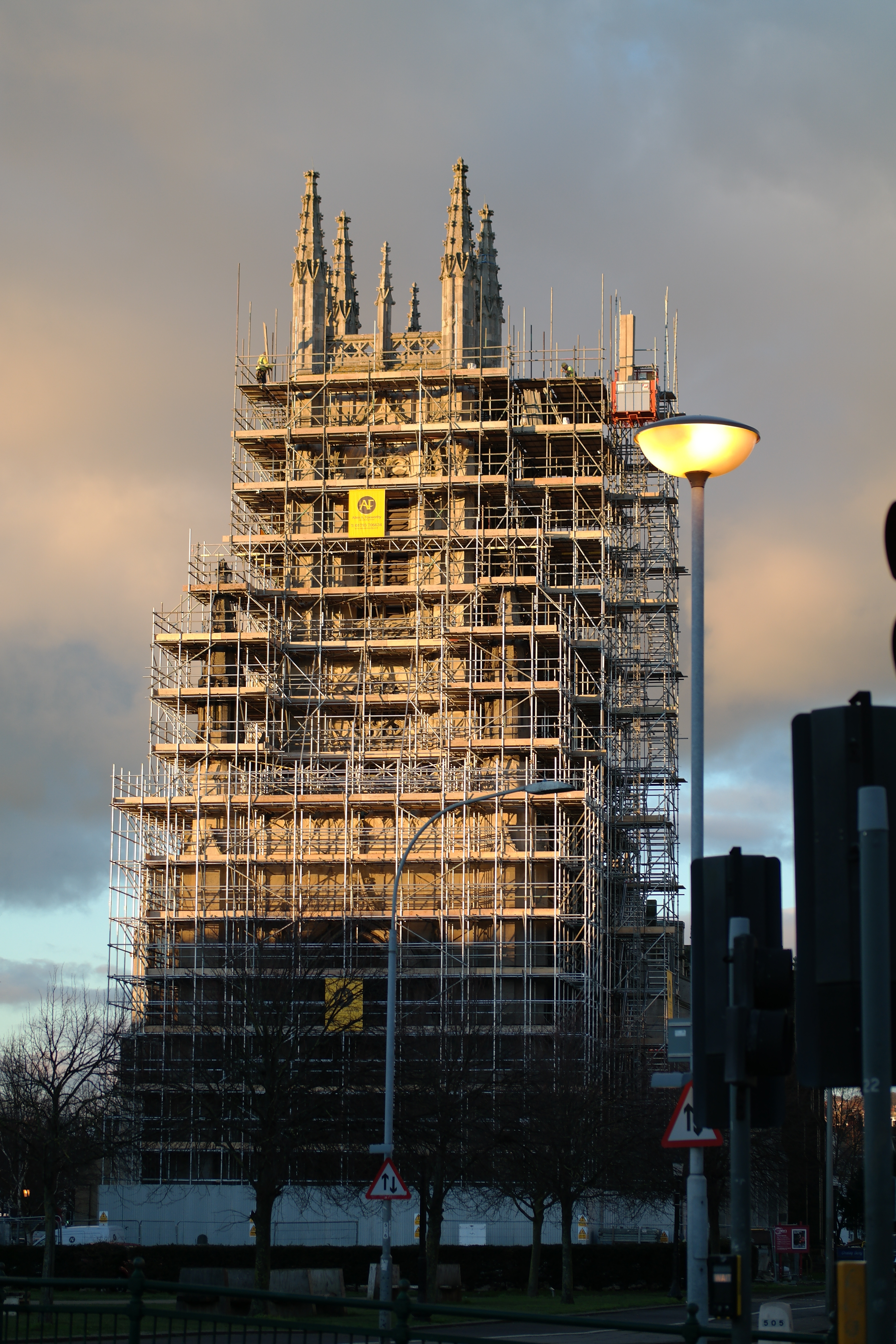
Church undergoing maintenance work in January 2015

== See also ==
- Grade II* listed buildings in Brighton and Hove
- List of places of worship in Brighton and Hove
- Regency architecture
- Edwardian architecture
