= Clarence House, Brighton =

Former hotel in Brighton

Clarence House
- Clarence Hotel; New Inn
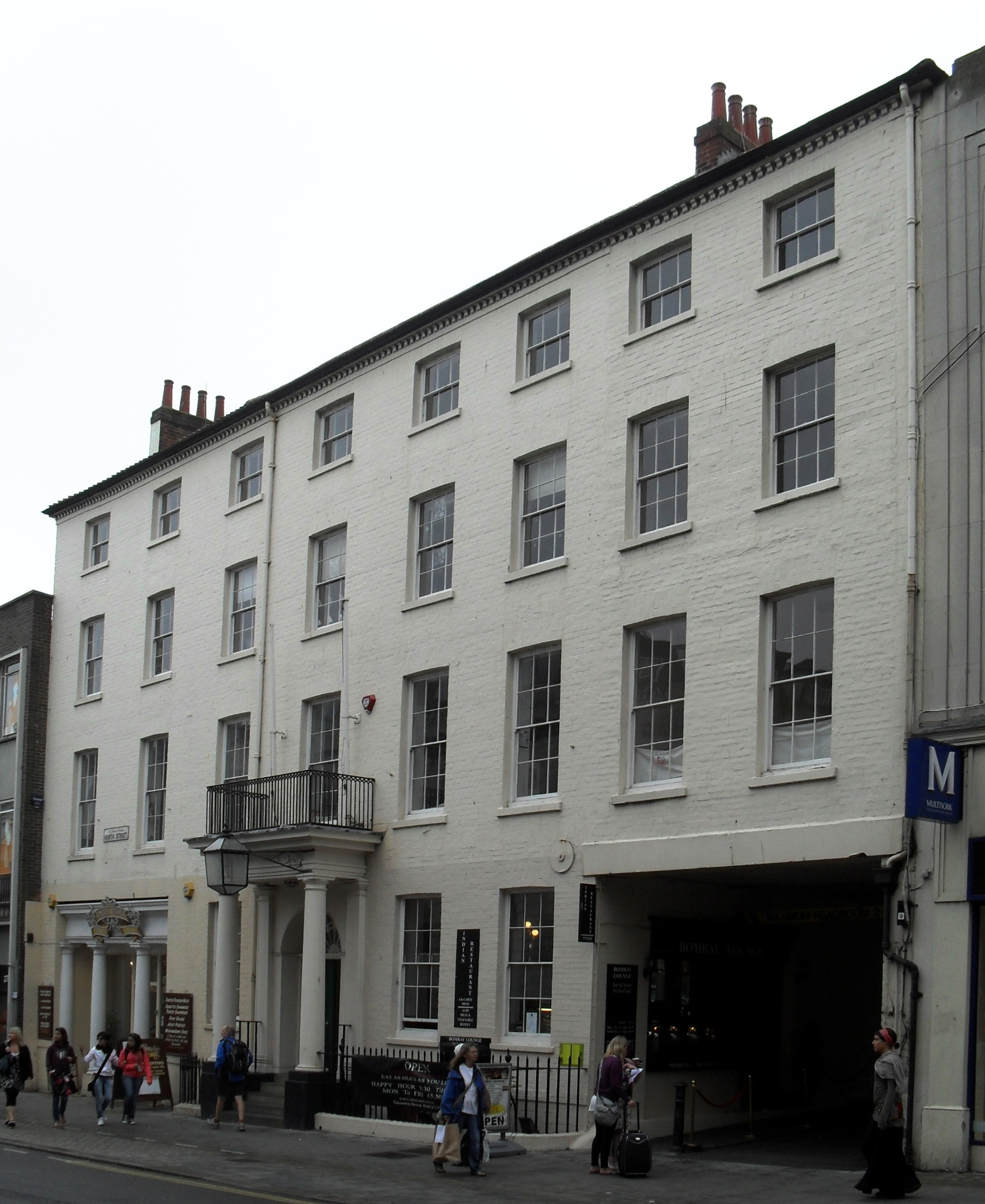
- The building from the northwest

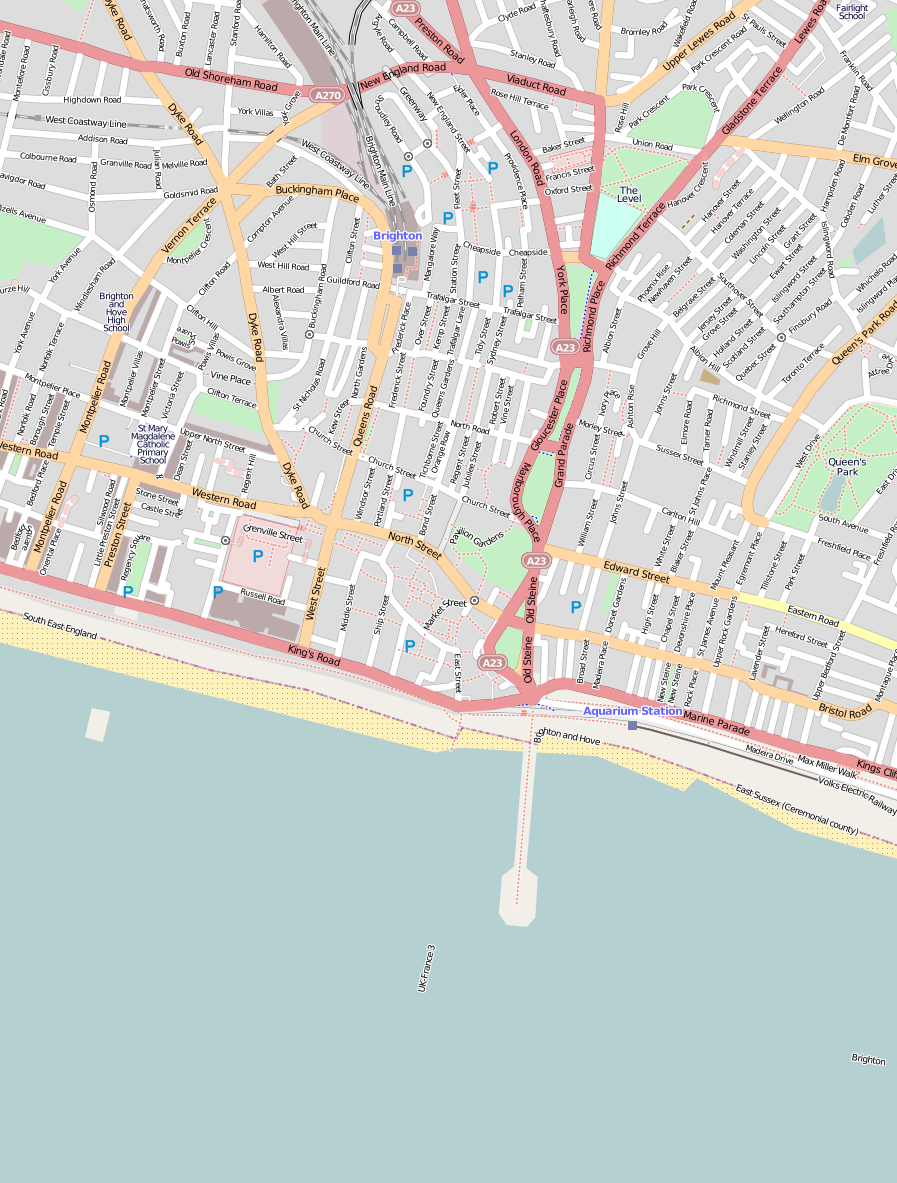
- Location within central Brighton
- 50.8229°N 0.1408°W
- Location: 30–31 North Street, Brighton, Brighton and Hove BN1 1EB, United Kingdom

History
- Built: 1785
- Built for: Thomas Whichelo
- Original use: Coaching inn

Site notes
- Architectural style: Georgian/Classical
- Restored: 1811; 1990
- Current use: Empty
- Owner: Moretons Investments Ltd

Listed Building – Grade II
- Official name: The Clarence Hotel and attached railings, Nos. 30 and 31 North Street
- Designated: 20 August 1971
- Reference no.: 1380618

Clarence House, previously the New Inn (1785–1830) and the Clarence Hotel (1830–1972), is a former coaching inn and hotel in Brighton, part of the English coastal city of Brighton and Hove. The only surviving coaching inn of many which used to stand on North Street, Brighton's main commercial thoroughfare, it retains much of its original "severely plain" Georgian appearance, with Classical features and mathematical tiles; but the interior has been changed since its closure in 1972 and conversion into a mixed-use commercial building. The four-storey structure, which is in a conservation area and which has been listed at Grade II by Historic England for its architectural and historical importance, is empty and has been vandalised and squatted repeatedly, but planning applications were raised in 2021 and 2022 for the creation of two flats and a new restaurant within the building.

== History ==
Brighton developed into a seaside resort in the 18th century and became increasingly popular with visitors. Those staying for a long period preferred staying in lodging-houses (where a whole house was rented) or, if they could afford to, buying holiday homes; but inns were an alternative, especially for people staying for a short time or seeking longer-term accommodation. A small number of inns existed by the 1740s, but the first documentary evidence is a map of 1778 showing 26 inns and public houses in the town. Many were conversions of existing buildings, but in 1785 Thomas Whichelo, a local brewer, acquired a site on the south side of North Street and built the New Inn. North Street was, and remains, Brighton's "main commercial thoroughfare" and was also, in the 18th century, the main route into and out of Brighton for visitors; the New Inn was one of the earliest of many inns which opened along it, but all the others (such as the Unicorn Inn and the White Lion, both on the north side of the street) have been demolished.

The New Inn advertised itself both as a hotel – one of the first places in Brighton to be called a hotel, and "such an innovation that the local gentry discussed it in their correspondence" – and as a coaching inn, taking advantage of its position on North Street as the "first place of rest that was offered" to visitors arriving from the London direction. In 1812, by which time it was owned and run by William Henwood – a partner in one of London's leading coaching firms – there were 26 bedrooms, ten lounges, a billiards room, a music room, a coffee room, and accommodation for six coaches and 50 horses. The music room was at the rear and was demolished in the mid-19th century, possibly in connection with the work carried out in 1868 when a newspaper advertisement stated that the hotel had "just been greatly enlarged and extensively refitted". As the importance of coaching declined, particularly with the coming of the railway, the hotel's character changed and it became more popular with families and commercial travellers.

Between 1790 and 1804, when Brighton Town Hall became the permanent venue, the Brighton Vestry meetings were held at various inns and public houses in rotation, and the New Inn was one of the regular venues. The Vestry meetings involved the churchwardens and overseers of Brighton parish, who at that time were responsible for the poor people of the parish and for certain civic and local government activities. Later, from November 1821 until 1823, Brighton's Courts of Petty session were moved to the New Inn. The inn was renamed the Clarence Hotel in 1830 to recognise the ascension to the throne earlier that year of William IV, who had previously held the title of the Duke of Clarence and St Andrews.

The Clarence Hotel closed in September 1972 and was squatted for a time. It then stood empty until the lower parts were converted into the head office of the Citizen's Regency Building Society, which had previously been based nearby at Citizen's House, 20–22 Marlborough Place. The ceremonial opening took place on 25 June 1979 and was conducted by Lord Rupert Nevill. The Citizen's Regency merged with the Hove-based Sussex Mutual Building Society in 1985, and other mergers resulted in it becoming part of the Portman Building Society. The upper parts of the building were converted into offices in 1990, and the left-hand section of the ground floor was removed and a shopfront inserted. In May of that year, during this work, the building started to collapse. North Street, one of Brighton's busiest roads, had to be closed to all traffic while stabilisation work was carried out. This caused "perhaps the most dramatic" series of bus diversions in the history of the Brighton & Hove bus company, when for a week all of its routes via North Street – about 120 buses per hour in each direction – had to travel via West Street and the seafront instead. (Note: During another road closure in 2024, it was stated that around 200 buses per hour used North Street.) Later, the rest of the ground floor was converted into an Indian buffet restaurant called the Bombay Lounge, but this closed and the building was again "extensively squatted". On 1 January 2020, the empty building was the scene of the murder of Billy Henham, a 24-year-old who suffered a "sustained and significant assault" by four men at a New Year party in the building.

In spring 2022, the owner of a nearby restaurant applied for planning permission to convert the ground floor of Clarence House into an 80-capacity restaurant and bar with an outside seating area. This was separate from a planning application raised the previous year to convert the upper storeys into flats. At that time the building was owned by a local property investment company, Moretons Investments Ltd: they acquired it in 2021.

== Heritage ==
Under the name The Clarence Hotel, Clarence House was listed at Grade II by English Heritage, the predecessor of Historic England, on 20 August 1971. This status is given to "nationally important buildings of special interest". As of February 2001, it was one of 1,124 Grade II-listed buildings and structures, and 1,218 listed buildings of all grades, in the city of Brighton and Hove.

The building is within the Old Town Conservation Area, one of 34 conservation areas in the city of Brighton and Hove. This was designated by Brighton Council in 1973 and extended four years later, and covers 46.77 acres (18.93 ha). Clarence House is an important survivor on North Street, which has been extensively redeveloped, and provides "the only surviving evidence of coaching inns" in that street. It has also been described as "the best surviving building of its period" on North Street.

== Architecture ==
There are three key dates in the former Clarence Hotel's architectural history. The original portion, on the right (west) side, dates from its original construction in 1785. The left-hand (eastern) extension dates from 1811; and in 1990 the building was restored and converted internally, and a Georgian Revival-style shopfront was inserted at ground-floor level in the 1811 extension.

The building is Georgian in style with a "Classical severity" and symmetry. There are four storeys and a basement. Each floor has an eight-window range, those on the top floor being smaller. The spacing of the three windows on the eastern extension is slightly wider than that of the five-window range on the original part dating from 1785, but the windows (all sashes) are otherwise identical. The main entrance is in the fourth bay, up a flight of steps and framed by a bold Tuscan porch. The double doors are set below a semicircular fanlight with decorative glazing and are flanked by Tuscan pilasters. Decorative iron railings on the top of the porch form a balcony at first-floor level. The walls of the building are faced with painted mathematical tiles laid to resemble Flemish bond brickwork, and there is also some stucco work. There is a tiled hipped roof set behind a parapet with a modillion and a cornice. There are chimney-stacks above the end walls and another on the roof of the original (1785) section.

== See also ==
- Media related to Clarence House, Brighton at Wikimedia Commons
- Grade II listed buildings in Brighton and Hove: C–D

== Bibliography ==
- Antram, Nicholas; Morrice, Richard (2008). Brighton and Hove. Pevsner Architectural Guides. London: Yale University Press. ISBN 978-0-300-12661-7.
- Berry, Sue (2005). Georgian Brighton. Chichester: Phillimore & Co. Ltd. ISBN 1-86077-342-7.
- Brighton & Hove City Council, City Development & Regeneration (March 2017). Old Town Conservation Area Character Statement (PDF) (Report). Hove.
- Brighton Polytechnic. School of Architecture and Interior Design (1987). A Guide to the Buildings of Brighton. Macclesfield: McMillan Martin. ISBN 1-869865-03-0.
- Carder, Timothy (1990). The Encyclopaedia of Brighton. Lewes: East Sussex County Libraries. ISBN 0-861-47315-9.
- Dale, Antony (1976). Brighton Town and Brighton People. Chichester: Phillimore & Co. Ltd. ISBN 0-85033-219-2.
- French, Roger (2010). Pride and Joy: My Amazing 25-year Journey with Brighton & Hove Buses. London: Best Impressions. ISBN 978-0-9565740-0-8.
- Musgrave, Clifford (1981). Life in Brighton. Rochester: Rochester Press. ISBN 0-571-09285-3.
