= Brighton Herald =

Former weekly newspaper published in Brighton, England

- Type: Weekly
- Format: Broadsheet
- Founder(s): H. Robertson Attree, Matthew Phillips
- Editor: Robert Sicklemore (founding editor)
- Founded: 6 September 1806
- Ceased publication: 30 September 1971
- Political alignment: Whig
- Language: English
- Headquarters: 2–3 Pavilion Buildings, Brighton, UK

The Brighton Herald (renamed The Brighton Herald & Hove Chronicle in 1902 and the Brighton & Hove Herald in 1922) was a weekly newspaper covering the boroughs of Brighton and Hove in southeast England. Founded in 1806 as the first newspaper in the fashionable seaside resort of Brighton, it survived until 1971 and was one of England's "leading provincial weekly" newspapers—being the first publication in the country to report several important international events, such as Napoleon's escape and the start of the July Revolution. Based in the centre of Brighton throughout its 165-year existence, it moved in 1934 to new premises at Pavilion Buildings, near the Royal Pavilion.

== History ==
The Brighton Herald was founded in 1806 by Harry Robertson Attree and Matthew Phillips as the first newspaper in the rapidly growing and fashionable seaside resort of Brighton. The first office was at 8 Middle Street (Note: The building is no longer extant. The street address is now incorporated into a disused former nightclub which fronts both Middle Street and West Street.) in The Lanes. Attree and Phillips, together with the founding editor Robert Sicklemore, published the first edition on Saturday 6 September 1806. Attree then ran the newspaper himself from May 1808 until January 1810, when William Fleet joined him as a partner. An office was taken in North Street, but after Attree left in April 1811 Fleet opened a new office in nearby Princes Place. Fleet was the sole proprietor until 1843; for the next 21 years until his retirement, he ran the Herald with his son Charles. After his father retired, Charles made long-serving journalist John Bishop a partner in the firm; Bishop then continued as sole proprietor after Fleet junior retired in 1880.

The paper took the name Brighton Herald & Hove Chronicle with effect from 19 July 1902, then on 4 November 1922 it became the Brighton & Hove Herald. A final move of premises took place in 1934 when John Leopold Denman's "very stylish" Neo-Georgian head office building at 2–3 Pavilion Buildings was completed. Denman was also responsible for designing the office building (Regent House) which replaced the old Princes Place premises.

In 1954 it was reported that the paper covered the area from Peacehaven in the east to Shoreham-by-Sea in the west, as well as the boroughs of Brighton and Hove where its sales were highest and where "it was very influential". It was also read by many people in nearby towns and villages such as Lancing, Hassocks and Burgess Hill.

The final edition of the Herald was published on 30 September 1971, after which the newspaper was absorbed by the Brighton & Hove Gazette. This was in turn merged into the Brighton & Hove Leader, a weekly free newspaper, in 1985. This is now published online on the website of The Argus, another longstanding local newspaper. The Brighton History Centre at The Keep, the archive and historical resource centre of East Sussex and the city of Brighton and Hove, holds copies of the newspaper from 1806 until 1970.

The Herald had "a long tradition of being first with the news". In the first half of the 19th century, it was the first newspaper in England to break the news of three stories of major international importances: Napoleon's escape from Elba in 1815, the start of the July Revolution in France in 1830, the arrival in England of the exiled King Louis Philippe I in 1848, and the Battles of the Talavera (1809) and Vitoria (1813). The Herald regularly broke such news because it was the main newspaper in Brighton and all communication from France at the time came via the Dieppe–Brighton shipping route.

== Political stance ==
Politically, the Herald was aligned to the Whig movement in the 19th century, as was its rival the Brighton Guardian; the town's other paper, the Brighton Gazette, was Tory. Brighton was dominated by radical Whig views at this time, and the Herald was accordingly influential. It was "implacably hostile" to the long-time Vicar of Brighton Henry Michell Wagner, a strong-willed High Tory who was "very unpopular in zealous Whig circles". For a man of such political views to be a vicar was "to this paper a contradiction in terms"; in his obituary the Herald that he should have entered the military instead. Its criticism of Wagner was especially strong in the 1840s during a lengthy controversy over Church rates in the town. The paper also stoked anti-Tory public feeling in its reporting of an incident involving Sir David Scott, 2nd Baronet, a magistrate and "uncompromising Tory", who had been made a Knight of the Royal Guelphic Order and granted a large pension by King George IV in questionable circumstances. The Herald "maintained that [his] motives were of the most mercenary and base character", and its reporting contributed to the "large amount of vituperation and abuse" he received.

== Notable stories and quotes ==
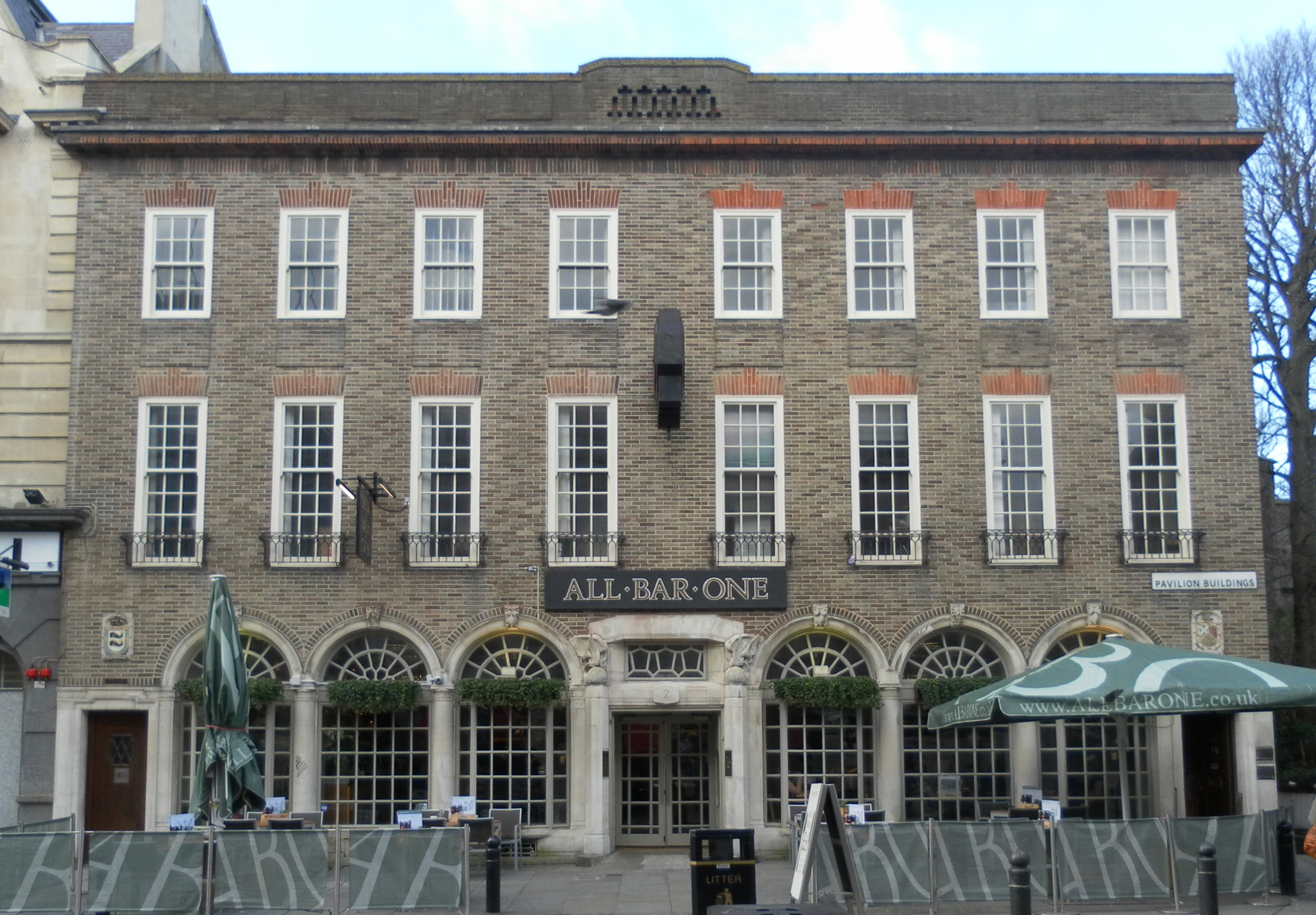
The Herald was based at 2–3 Pavilion Buildings, Brighton from 1934.

The Herald is an important source of information about Brighton's 19th-century development and the lives and activities of prominent local people. Amon Wilds, Amon Henry Wilds and Charles Busby—the leading architects of the Regency era who between them designed many of Brighton and Hove's landmark buildings—were regularly mentioned, and many of their works were described in detail. The Herald also reported Busby's claims that the partnership had been commissioned to design the Royal Sussex County Hospital (his rival Charles Barry was awarded the contract), and Busby's little-known experiments with paddle steamers, as reported in an 1832 edition. Editions of the 1830s detailed the progress of the Kemp Town estate and the financial pressure it put on its developers Thomas Read Kemp (which eventually led to his escape to France and death there) and Thomas Cubitt.

The newspaper reported on all the major events affecting Brighton in the 19th and early 20th centuries, often in detail. It carried a special report on the opening of the Brighton Main Line on 21 September 1841, describing the arrival of the first train with "much the same level of excitement as that with which [people in 1969] watched the first man landing on the moon". In 1861 it carried the most detailed report on the Clayton Tunnel rail crash, the worst in Britain at the time. Crowds of people, angered by the disaster, gathered to await publication of a special supplement on 31 August 1861, six days later, and "windows were broken and fittings torn from walls in the struggle for news" when it was delayed.

At the opening of Preston Park—Brighton's oldest and largest public park—the newspaper claimed that "public parks are the best competitors for public houses". It was enthusiastic about King Edward VII's patronage of the town, claiming in 1908 that "nothing could exert a finer influence on the fortunes of Brighton ... [and] bring about an influx of rank and fashion to the town" and criticising "ranting demagogues" who had carried out a "socialistic demonstration" outside Arthur Sassoon's house in Hove, where the king was visiting.

The Herald reported extensively on the 1926 United Kingdom general strike. It coined the name "the Battle of Lewes Road" for the town's most famous incident, produced a special edition devoted to the strike, and also covered in depth an incident earlier that week in which a woman drove her car "at tremendous speed" at a group of strikers. The paper was sympathetic to the special constables who were sent in by Brighton Corporation to break the strike—praising the "determined, formidable" men "well set up on their fine horses" and noting that the blows they dealt with their clubs "seemed to be unintentional".

In 1935, the newspaper published a special illustrated supplement setting out Alderman Sir Herbert Carden's radical plans for the entire redevelopment of Brighton's seafront, from Kemp Town in the east to Brunswick Town in the west. The City Beautiful: A Vision of New Brighton envisaged the demolition of all the Regency-style buildings in favour of modern blocks of flats in the style of Embassy Court, which Carden greatly admired. Public reaction to these proposals was negative, and the Regency Society (a locally influential conservation and architectural interest group) was formed in reaction to them. In 1947, it carried an interview with Winston Churchill when he was awarded the Freedom of the Borough of Brighton, including the statesman's reminiscences of a popular flea circus on the seafront.

As well as news, the Herald sometimes published poems and other literary work: for example, it regularly carried stories by popular Victorian novelist Mary Elizabeth Braddon in the late 1850s, before her first novel The Trail of the Serpent was published.

== Fake news controversy ==
In November 2019 the EU Disinformation Taskforce uncovered evidence that the Brighton Herald was among 265 local news titles across the world which had been used by an India-based online influencer network to spread disinformation about Pakistan.

== Bibliography ==
- Antram, Nicholas; Morrice, Richard (2008). Brighton and Hove. Pevsner Architectural Guides. London: Yale University Press. ISBN 978-0-300-12661-7.
- Carder, Timothy (1990). The Encyclopaedia of Brighton. Lewes: East Sussex County Libraries. ISBN 0-861-47315-9.
- Dale, Antony (1967) [1947]. Fashionable Brighton 1820–1860 (2nd ed.). Newcastle-upon-Tyne: Oriel Press Ltd. ISBN 0-85362-028-8.
- Dale, Antony (1976). Brighton Town and Brighton People. Chichester: Phillimore & Co. Ltd. ISBN 0-85033-219-2.
- Gilbert, Edmund M. (1975) [1954]. Brighton: Old Ocean's Bauble. Hassocks: Flare Books. ISBN 0-901759-39-2.
- Musgrave, Clifford (1981). Life in Brighton. Rochester: Rochester Press. ISBN 0-571-09285-3.
- Underwood, Eric (1978). Brighton. London: B.T. Batsford Ltd. ISBN 0-7134-0895-2.
- Wagner, Anthony; Dale, Antony (1983). The Wagners of Brighton. Chichester: Phillimore & Co. Ltd. ISBN 0-85033-445-4.
