= Chapel Royal, Brighton =

Church in East Sussex, England

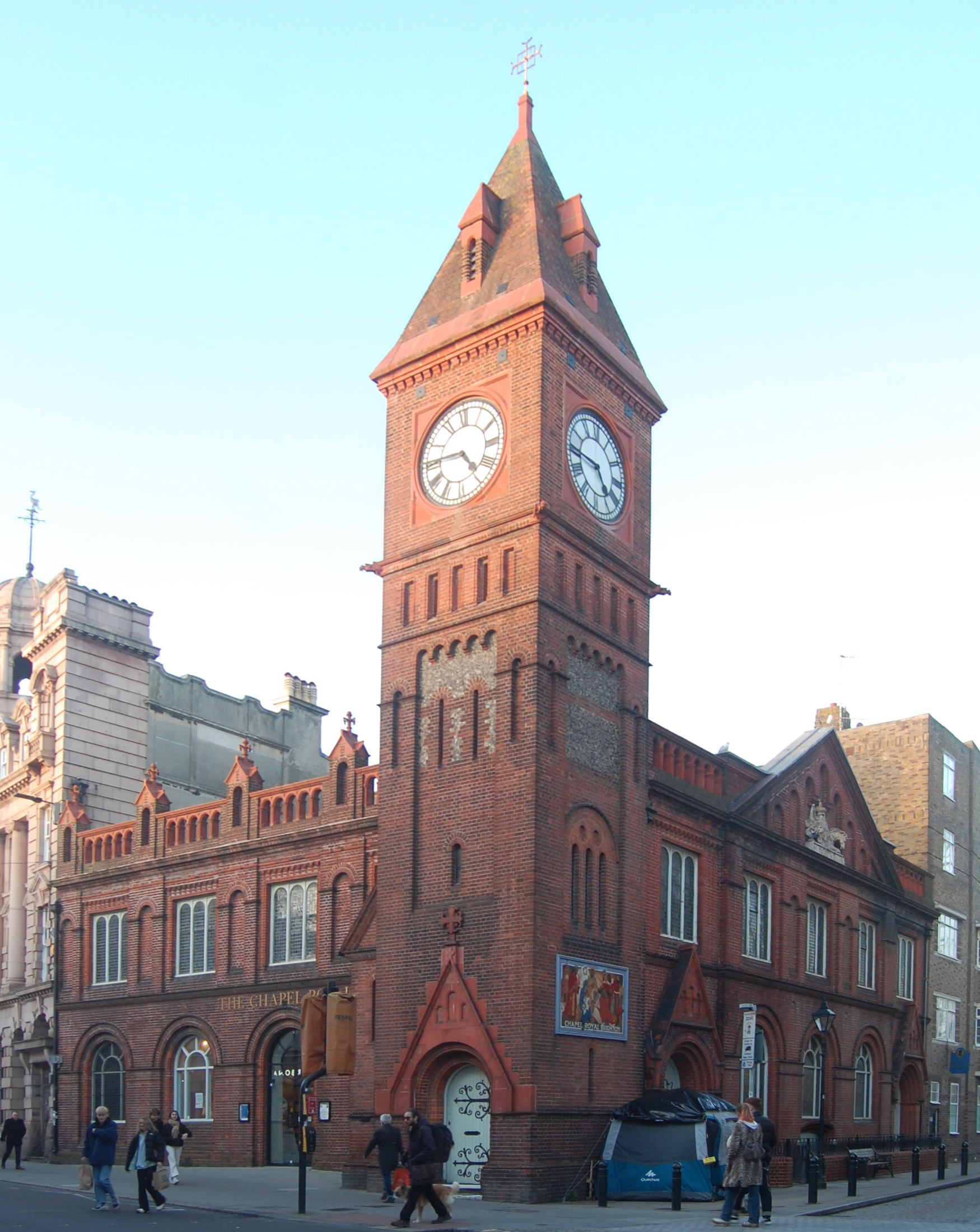
- Chapel Royal, Brighton
- 50.8226°N 0.1394°W
- Denomination: Church of England
- Website: www.chapelroyalbrighton.org.uk

Administration
- Province: Canterbury
- Diocese: Chichester
- Archdeaconry: Chichester
- Deanery: Rural Deanery of Brighton
- Parish: Brighton, St Peter with the Chapel Royal

Clergy
- Vicar: Revd David J. Biggs

The Chapel Royal is an 18th-century place of worship in the centre of Brighton, part of the English city of Brighton and Hove. Built as a chapel of ease, it became one of Brighton's most important churches, gaining its own parish and becoming closely associated with the Prince Regent and fashionable Regency-era society. It remains an active church.

== History ==
In the 18th century, Brighton was a small town based on a declining fishing industry and still suffering the effects of damage caused by the Great Storm of 1703. Its population in the middle of the century was approximately 2,000. Its fortunes improved after a doctor from nearby Lewes, Richard Russell, wrote a treatise encouraging the use of seawater as a cure for illness, in particular glandular swellings. He recommended bathing in the sea and drinking the water at Brighton. This form of medical therapy became popular, and helped make the town a fashionable place to visit.

Brighton became increasingly popular throughout the rest of the century, but received its next significant boost when the Prince Regent, son of King George III, made his first visit in 1783. By 1786 he had a home in the town—a rented farmhouse near the Old Steine, inland from the coast—and he later commissioned the architect John Nash to build a palace, the Royal Pavilion, for him on the site. The Prince was an infrequent churchgoer, and Brighton's only Anglican church, St Nicholas, was a long way from his home and up a steep hill. Furthermore, the ever-increasing number of visitors and residents caused overcrowding in the church. In 1789 the new Vicar of Brighton, Revd Thomas Hudson, decided to resolve these problems by building a new chapel near the Prince's house. He hoped to encourage the Prince to attend, and thereby worship more often than he had in the past, and considered that a more central chapel would relieve the pressure on the parish church.

The Prince was happy with the arrangement, agreeing to rent a pew and lay the foundation stone. A ceremony took place on 25 November 1793 at the corner of North Street and the newly built and named Prince's Place. Construction work, overseen by a builder named Bodle and to the design of London-based architect Thomas Saunders, lasted a year. The Prince and his wife of four months, Caroline of Brunswick, attended the inaugural service on 3 August 1795.

Brighton Chapel of Ease Act 1803
- Act of Parliament
- Parliament of the United Kingdom
- Long title: An Act to establish a Chapel of Ease at Brighthelmston in the County of Sussex.
- Citation: 43 Geo. 3. c. xci

Dates
- Royal assent: 24 June 1803

Text of statute as originally enacted

Revd Hudson owned and ran the chapel himself at first, opening it only during the peak seasons when Brighton was at its busiest. In 1803 it became the official chapel of ease to St Nicholas Church when he obtained a local act of Parliament, the Brighton Chapel of Ease Act 1803 (43 Geo. 3. c. xci) formalising this. Among other things, this act allowed Hudson, in his position as Vicar of Brighton, and his successors in that role, to appoint a perpetual curate for the chapel, and to fund a stipend of £115 (at 1803 prices) by the rental of pews. Of the pew spaces in the church, only 224 had to be provided free—the others could be "auctioned"—and visitors with no pew of their own could be charged an admission fee of 1/-. In return, the curate's responsibilities included paying for a clerk and the sacramental bread and wine used at Communion, and funding maintenance of the building. Many later chapels of ease in Brighton and Hove had similar Acts passed for them, imposing similar conditions.

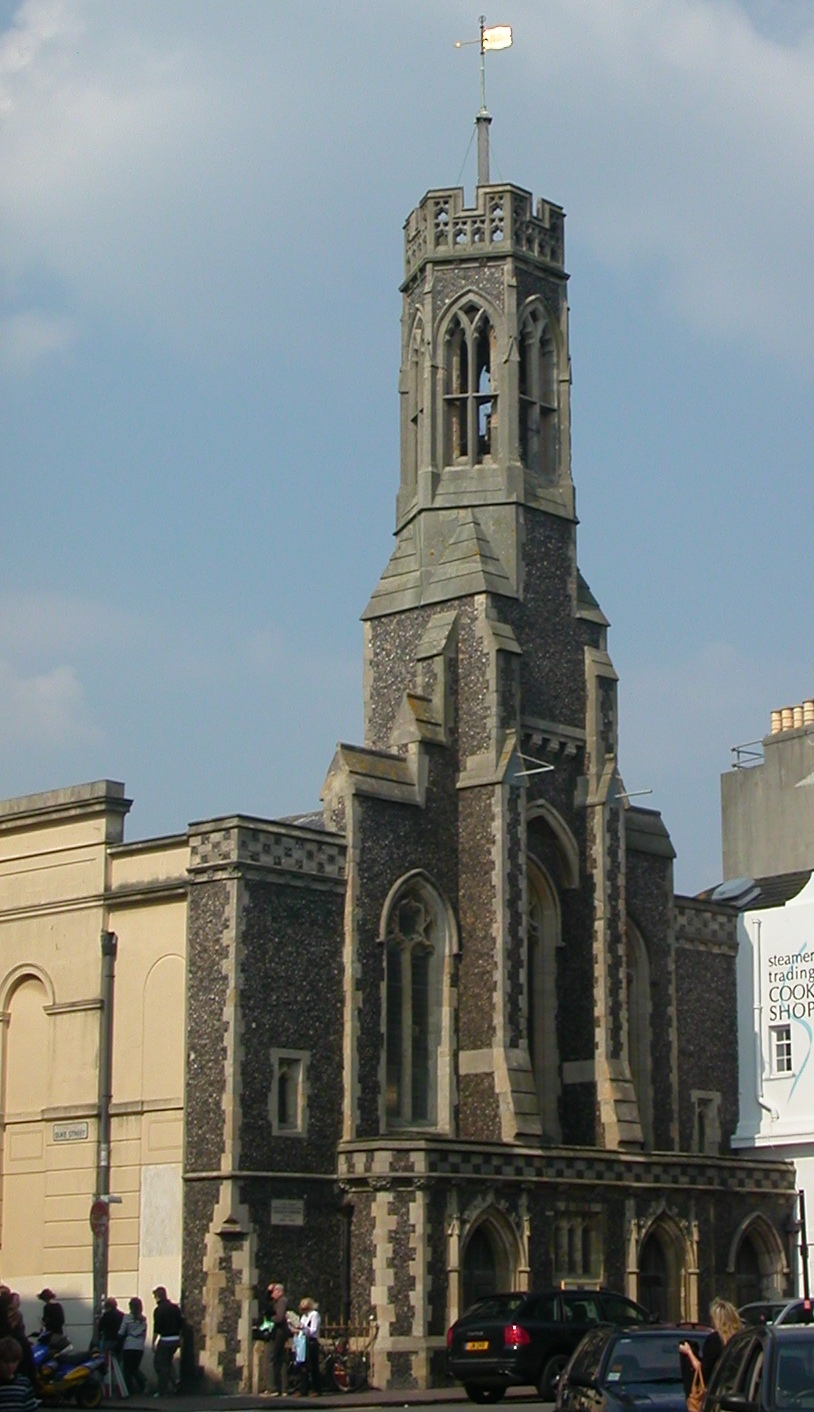
The Holy Trinity Church came close on three occasions to being included within the Chapel Royal's parish; when it closed, its congregation transferred to the Chapel Royal.

Soon after becoming a formal chapel of ease, the Chapel Royal was consecrated by the Bishop of Chichester, John Buckner. However, by that date (16 August 1803), the Prince Regent was no longer worshipping there. His attendance became infrequent soon after the chapel was built, and he eventually stopped worshipping there when a sermon, said to have been on the topic of immorality, offended him. (Sources differ on who preached the sermon, thought to have been entitled "Thou art the man".) Other members of the Royal Family occasionally visited the chapel later, however; the last recorded attendance was by Princess Augusta Sophia, the Prince Regent's sister, in 1840. Later in the 19th century, two future British prime ministers were regular worshippers at the chapel. William Ewart Gladstone attended whenever he visited Brighton, and Winston Churchill attended between 1883 and 1885 when he was a pupil at a local school.

The ownership of the chapel passed to various curates until Revd Thomas Trocke, formerly of St Nicholas Church, became perpetual curate in 1834. He stayed until his retirement in 1875, seeing the chapel taking charge of its own district for the first time in 1873 when the parish structure in Brighton was reorganised. The building was closed for eight months in 1876 and 1877 for internal structural repairs and reordering. Architect Arthur Blomfield was responsible for the changes, which cost £2,700. Soon afterwards, in 1880, demolition of houses facing North Street revealed the southern face of the chapel for the first time: until then, only the east elevation (facing Prince's Place) could be seen. Blomfield produced a design for a completely new exterior, including a tower in the southeast corner at the junction of the two streets. The work was completed in two parts—the new south face first, then the remodelled east elevation in 1896—and cost £1,200.

The chapel gained its own full parish for the first time in 1896, at which point the ownership of the church was transferred to the Ecclesiastical Commissioners. By this time, however, the residential population of central Brighton was declining rapidly as the streets making up the parish became more commerce– and retail–focused. Three proposals had been made by 1930 to incorporate the unparished Holy Trinity Church in nearby Ship Street into the Chapel Royal's parish, in order to expand it and make it more viable. These were all resisted, however, and by the mid-20th century the local population was so low that the parish was instead merged with that of St Peter's Church at the top of Old Steine. Legally, this took effect from 25 July 1978 by means of an Order in Council. The Chapel Royal again became a separate parish in July 2009 after the legal redundancy of St Peter's Church. Services became irregular, and one aisle of the chapel was converted into a Christian bookshop. However, the closure of the Holy Trinity church in 1984 resulted in additional services being provided for the displaced congregation, and a regular schedule of services is now in operation. Alterations and a reconfiguration of the church interior in the bicentennial year (1995) completed the transition from a parish church, focusing on the population of a specific locality, to a "city church" open to the whole community and meeting the spiritual needs of the permanent and transient population of Brighton.

== Architecture ==
The original chapel was a stuccoed building in a broadly Classical style, with rounded sash windows and a pediment with the Prince's coat of arms. A row of Doric columns flanked the entrance. Inside there were galleries on each wall, supported by decorated columns. The gallery above the altar contained the organ, and there was a tall, highly decorated pulpit. The alterations of 1876–1877 removed the gallery above the altar and added a chancel, separated from the nave by an iron rood screen, new pulpit and lectern.

The rebuilding of the exterior in 1882–1883 (south elevation) and 1896 (east elevation), prompted by the demolition of buildings adjacent to the south side of the chapel to allow North Street to be widened, involved replacing the stucco with red brick, enlarging the pediment and giving the new south elevation a similar appearance. It is neither as tall nor as long as the east side (facing Prince's Place), and has no pediment, but was otherwise very similar until the alterations of 1995 changed the entrance area and added more glass to make more of the interior visible from the street. The most significant feature of Arthur Blomfield's work on the exterior was the tall, red-brick clock tower. This has some flintwork and a hipped slate roof. The tower has four clock faces, each in a terracotta insert.

== The chapel today ==
The main weekly service at the Chapel Royal is held on Sundays at 10.00am. Other services are held on Wednesdays. There has been a long musical tradition at the chapel; concerts have been held right from the beginning, and continue to be a regular feature, usually on Tuesdays. A coffee shop, run jointly by parishioners from the Chapel Royal on behalf of local charities, operates every Saturday. The building is also a venue for regular Alcoholics Anonymous meetings, as part of the chapel's pastoral responsibility to help people in the city who face difficulties in their lives.

The chapel was listed at Grade II* on 30 July 1992. As of February 2001, it was one of 70 Grade II*-listed buildings and structures, and 1,218 listed buildings of all grades, in the city of Brighton and Hove.

== External conservation repairs ==
Repairs were carried out in 2012 by HMDW Architects and PAYE Stonework, due to unsafe, falling brickwork, particularly due to freeze-thaw erosion in the cold winter of 2009. The scope of work included terracotta replacement across the south elevation and tower, areas of repointing in lime mortar, replacement of steel lintels in the south elevation and the installation of a lightning conductor. The conservation project received the King of Prussia Gold Medal in 2012.

== Gallery ==
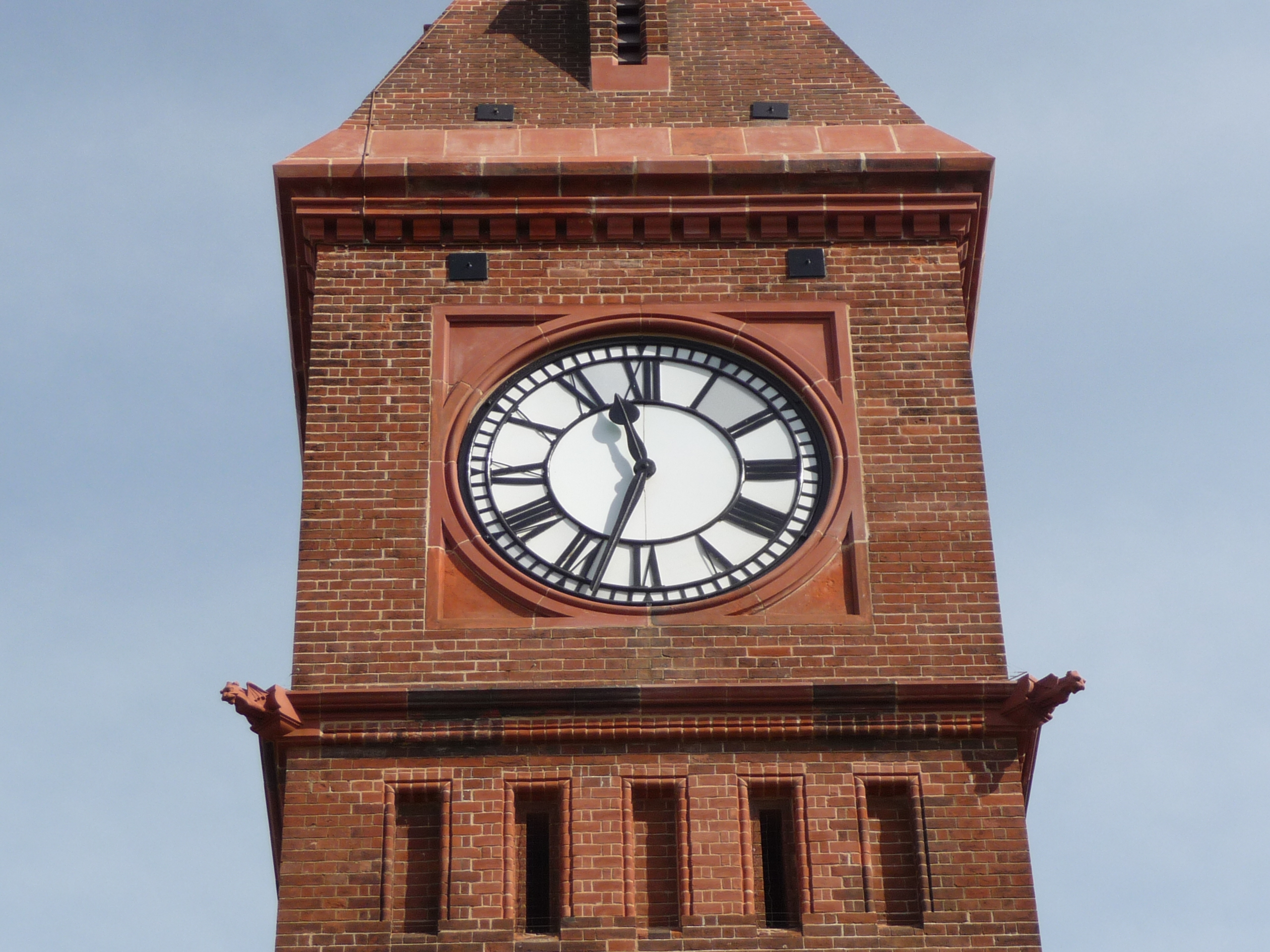
Tower with clock, after building project, 2012

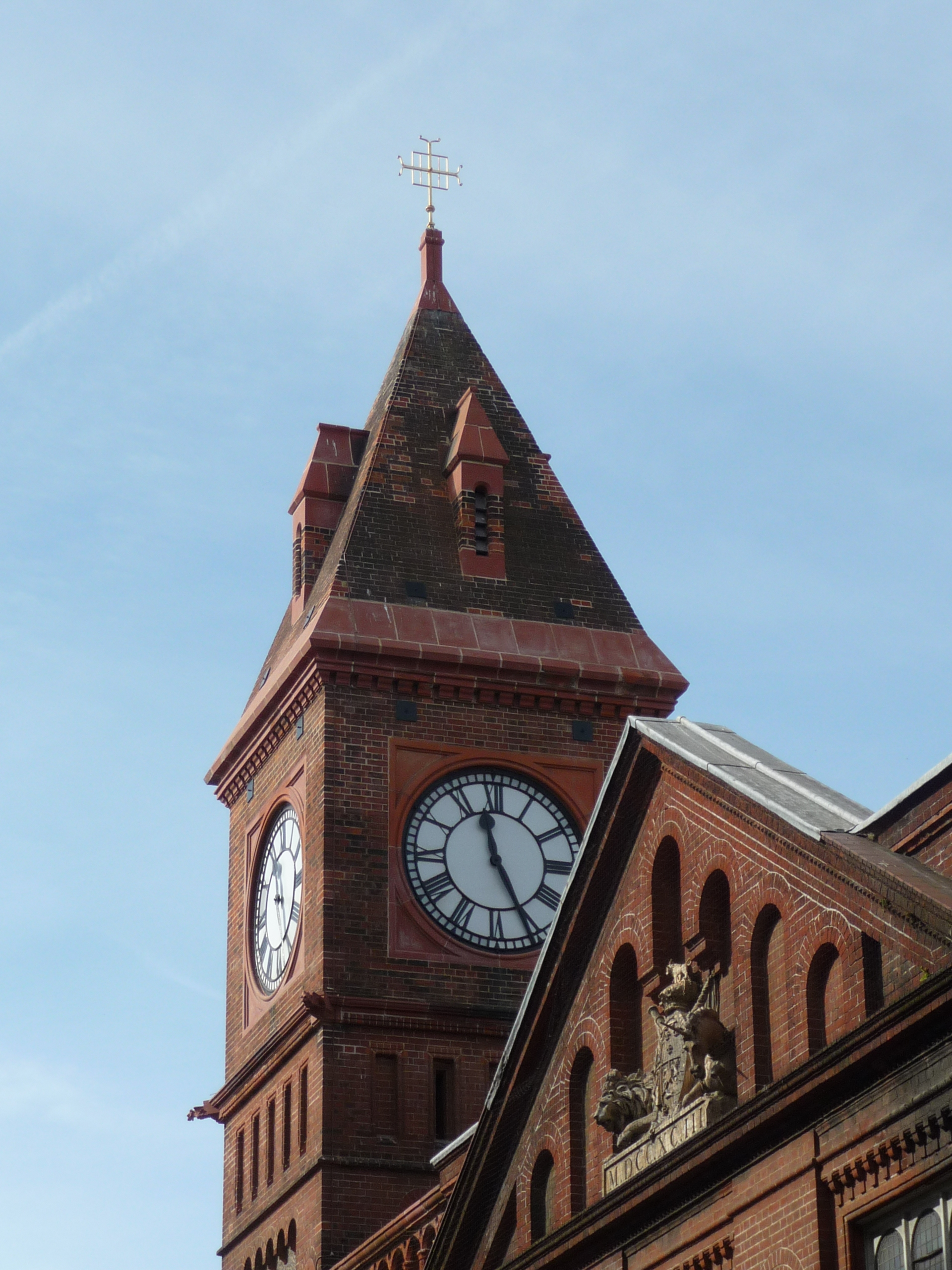
Tower with clock, after building project, 2012

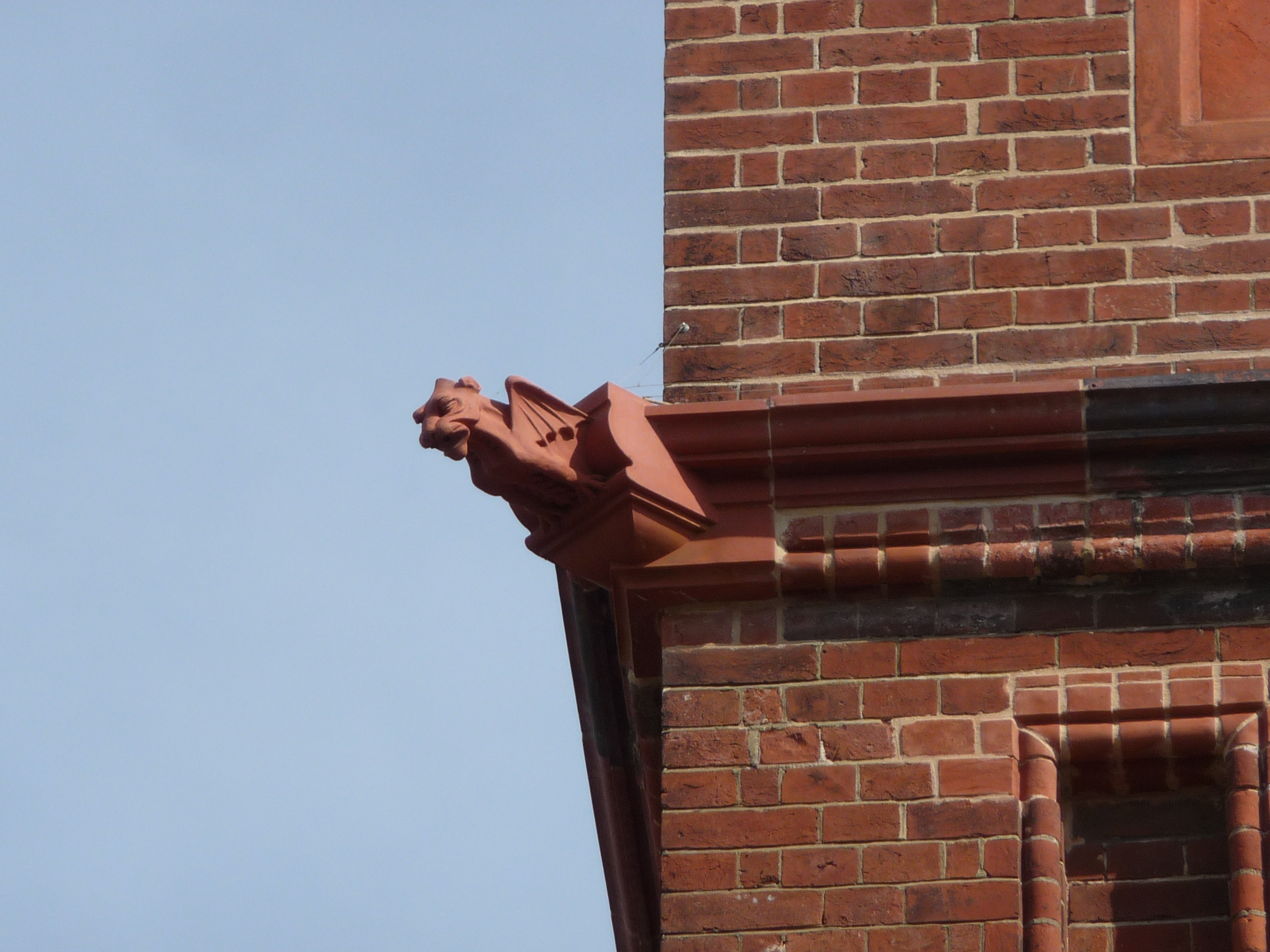
Detail of gargoyle sculpture at high level of tower, after restoration

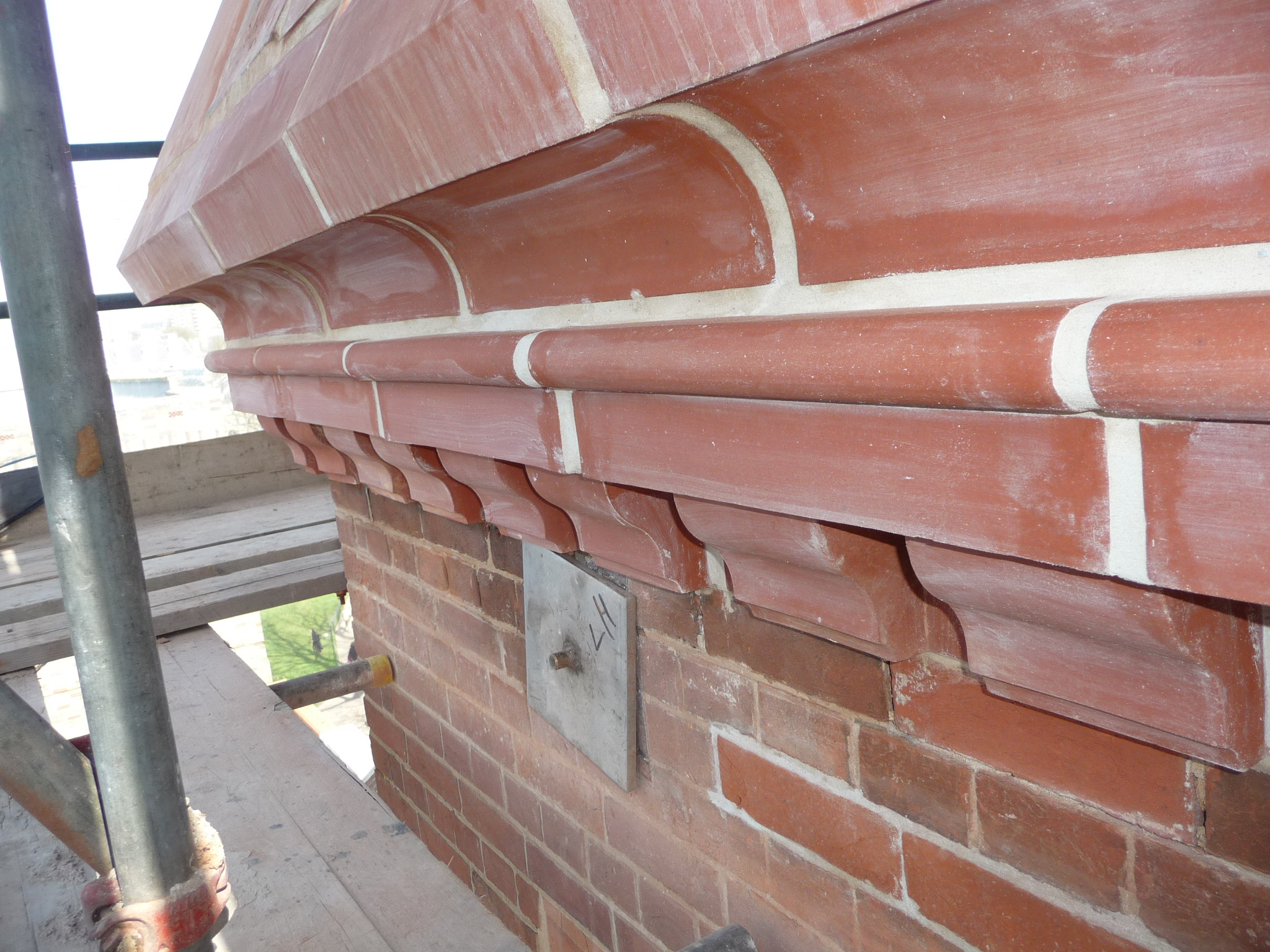
Detail of replaced tower brickwork and terracotta

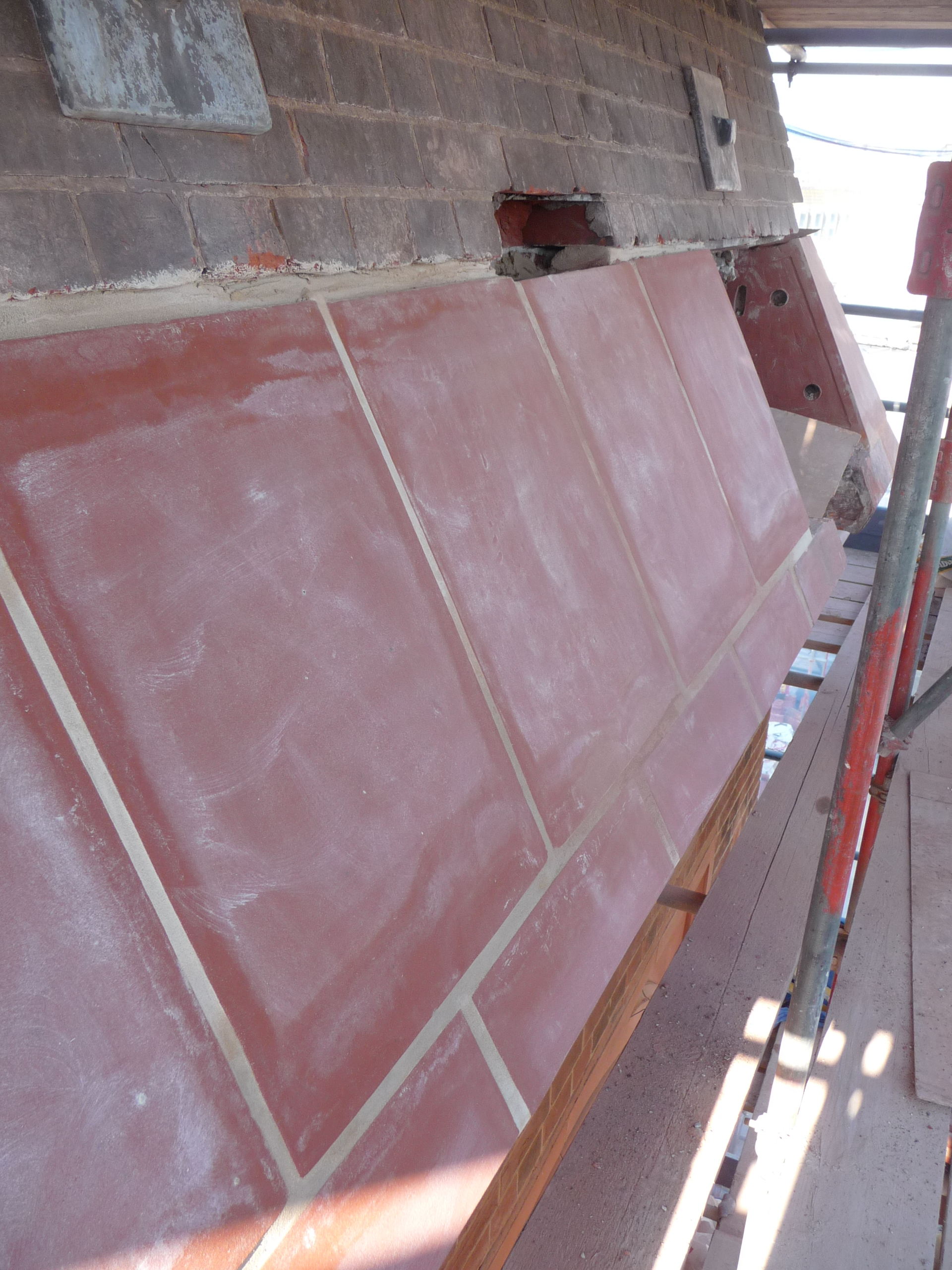
Replacement of tiles at high level

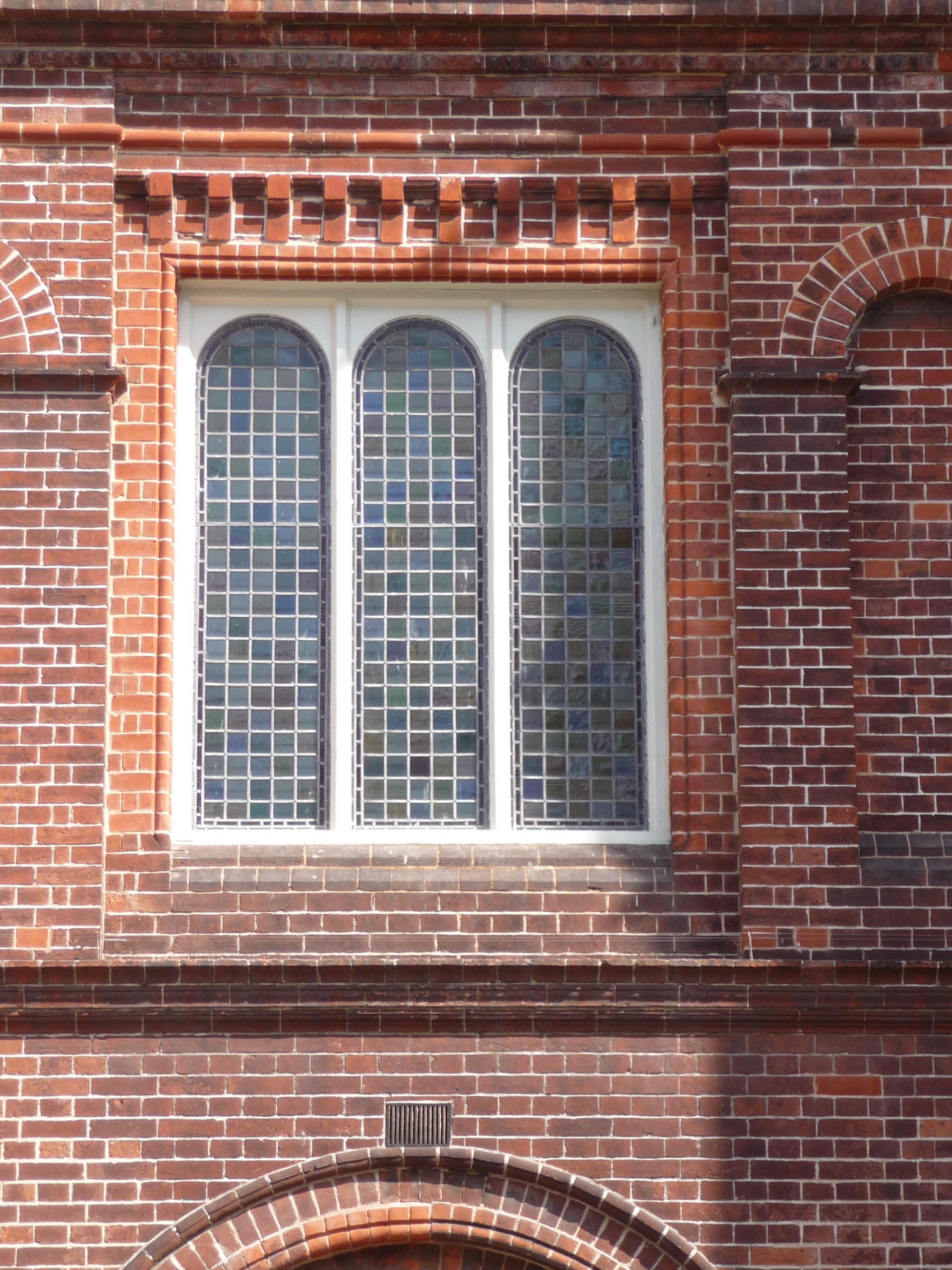
Window with replaced brickwork

== See also ==
- List of places of worship in Brighton and Hove
