= Drill Hall (disambiguation) =

A drill hall is a building where soldiers practice and perform military drills.

Drill Hall or drill hall may also refer to:

== Buildings used as drill halls ==
- Beatty Street Drill Hall, Vancouver, Canada
- Carlton Place drill hall, Southampton, England, UK

== Buildings converted to other uses ==
- Bank Parade drill hall, Burnley, Lancashire, England, UK
- Church Street drill hall, Brighton, Sussex, England, UK
- Dalmeny Street drill hall, a community arts and education centre in Dalmeny Street, Edinburgh, Scotland, UK
- Drill Hall, Adelaide, part of the Torrens Parade Ground in Adelaide, South Australia
- Drill Hall Gallery, an art gallery owned by the Australian National University, Canberra
- Drill Hall Library, Chatham, Kent, England, UK
- Forrest Hill drill hall, Edinburgh, Scotland, UK
- Phoenix Street drill hall, Lancaster, England, UK
- Poyser Street drill hall, Wrexham, Wales, UK
- RADA Studios, a theatrical venue in Chenies Street, Bloomsbury, London, formerly The Drill Hall
