= Gwydyr Mansions =

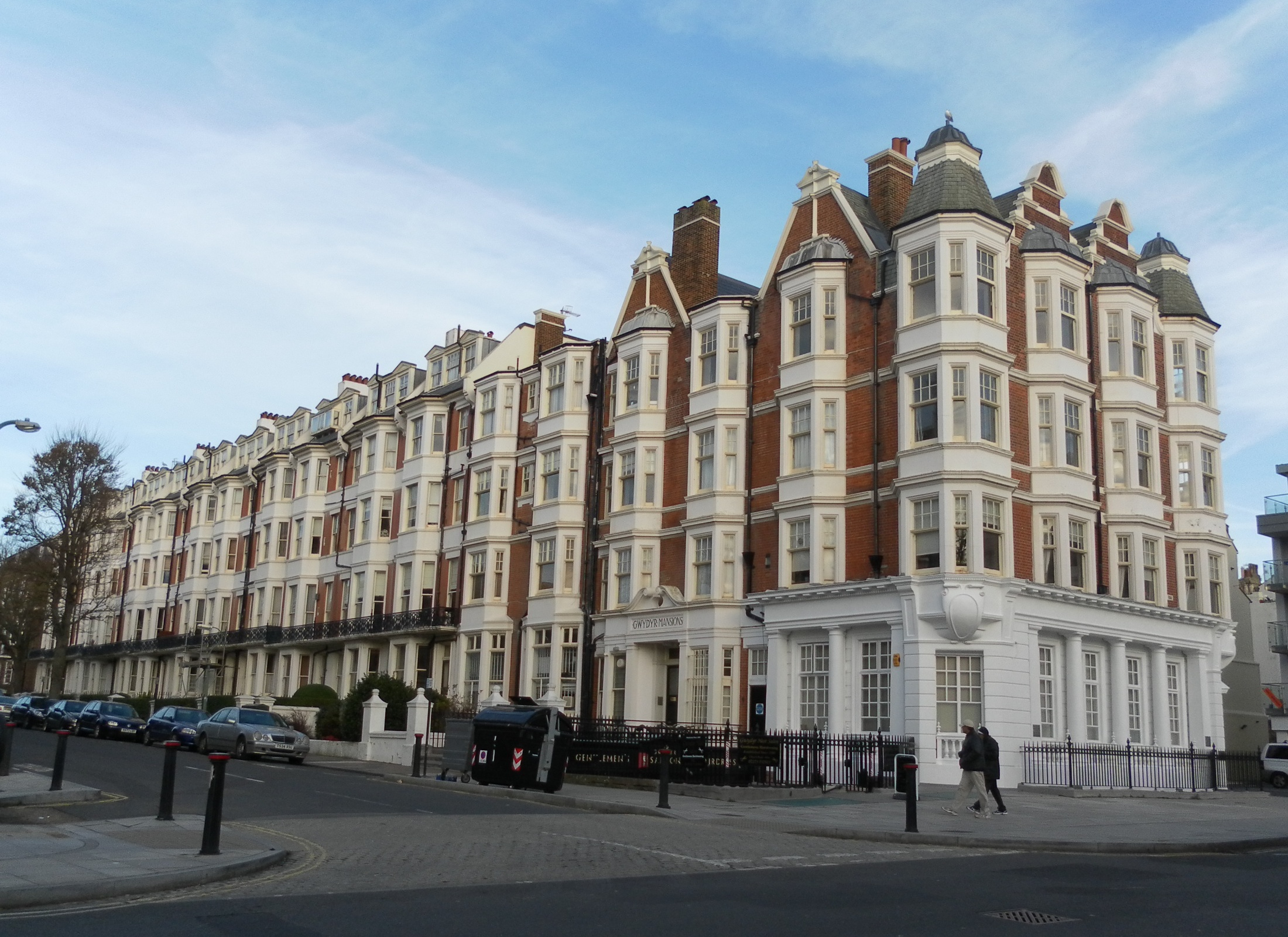
- Gwydyr Mansions from the southwest

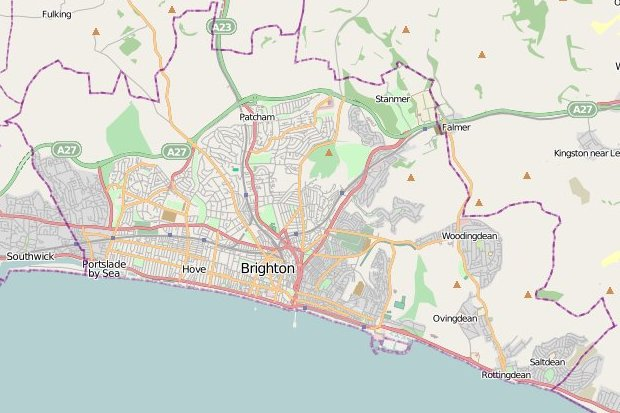
- Location within Brighton & Hove

General information
- Status: Completed
- Type: Mansion flats
- Architectural style: Flemish Renaissance
- Location: Rochester Gardens/Palmeira Square, Hove BN3 1JW, Brighton and Hove, England
- Coordinates: 50.8268°N 0.1620°W
- Groundbreaking: 1890
- Completed: 1890
- Landlord: Austin Rees (managing agents)

Technical details
- Floor count: 4

Design and construction
- Architecture firm: Clayton & Black

Gwydyr Mansions is a block of mansion flats in the centre of Hove, part of the English coastal city of Brighton and Hove. Built on the initiative of a Baptist pastor and designed by the prolific architecture firm of Clayton & Black, the "elegant" Flemish Renaissance-style building dates from 1890 and overlooks a central square. As originally built, the block had a restaurant and barber shop for residents; the latter is still operational.

== History ==
The Wick estate was a large area of land north of the ancient village of Hove. Sir Isaac Lyon Goldsmid, part of the Goldsmid banking dynasty, bought most of the land for development in 1830. The estate was 250 acres (100 ha) in size and consisted of farmland, pastures and woodland. Until then, Thomas Scutt and Thomas Read Kemp owned the land: they developed the high-class Brunswick estate on part of it, and sold the rest to Goldsmid.

Residential and commercial development was gradual but steady for the rest of the 19th century. One of the main developments was Palmeira Square, built in the 1850s and 1860s as an open square of housing with gardens in the middle and a public garden to the north. Holland Road, laid out in 1833 but still mostly undeveloped by the mid-1850s, led north from Palmeira Square. Goldsmid was created Baron Goldsmid of Palmeira in 1845, and the square took its name from this title; Holland Road was named after Henry Vassall-Fox, 3rd Baron Holland (Lord Holland), a Whig statesman and friend of Goldsmid.

Holland Road Baptist Church was built in 1883 on land (known as the Goldsmid Estate) that was owned by Goldsmid's descendants; the terms of the Goldsmid Estate Act 1879 made it easier for parts of the 188-acre (76 ha) site to be sold for development. The church's first pastor, Rev. David Davies, proposed a scheme for a block of luxury flats opposite the church on a site between Holland Road, Palmeira Square and Rochester Gardens. The site was bought in 1890, and Brighton-based architects Clayton & Black were commissioned to design the building. Established in the 1870s, this firm designed many types of building in Brighton and Hove over a 100-year period and in an eclectic range of styles.

The building was ready later in 1890. It was named after another associate of the Goldsmid family, Peter Drummond-Burrell, 22nd Baron Willoughby de Eresby. Like Sir Isaac Goldsmid, he supported Jewish emancipation, and at the time of his visit to Hove to see the new Brunswick estate in the late 1820s he held the title 2nd Baron Gwydyr. Each of the 50 flats had servants' accommodation, reflecting the social status of the expected occupants: from the beginning Gwydyr Mansions was aimed at wealthy people. Flats were for rent, not sale, as was common at the time. Clayton & Black's design included several facilities for residents: the whole ground floor was taken up by a bank with its own entrance, there was a 60-seat restaurant in the basement, and also at basement level there was a barber shop—the Gwydyr Gentlemen's Hairdressing Saloon. It was refitted in 1936 and is still in use, unlike the restaurant and bank. In 1940, the restaurant was identified as a potential "emergency rest centre" for war casualties.

Gwydyr Mansions are within the Brunswick Town Conservation Area, one of 34 conservation areas in the city of Brighton and Hove. The 95.92-acre (38.82 ha) area was designated by Hove Council in 1969.

== Architecture ==
The mansions, one of Clayton & Black's first commissions for a new building, are Flemish Renaissance Revival in style. The walls are of red brick with large areas of pale ashlar, especially around the windows. The main entrance is on the Rochester Gardens elevation and is next to the former entrance to the bank, which is flanked by Tuscan columns in antis. Above is a pediment with a cartouche. There are canted bay windows rising through all four storeys and oriel windows at the corners, and the "busy" façade also features domed turrets, crow-stepped gables and other elaborate gables. The barber shop was refitted in 1936 with vitrolite fixtures, but a glazed screen designed by Clayton & Black survives near the entrance.
