= Grade II listed buildings in Brighton and Hove: P–R =

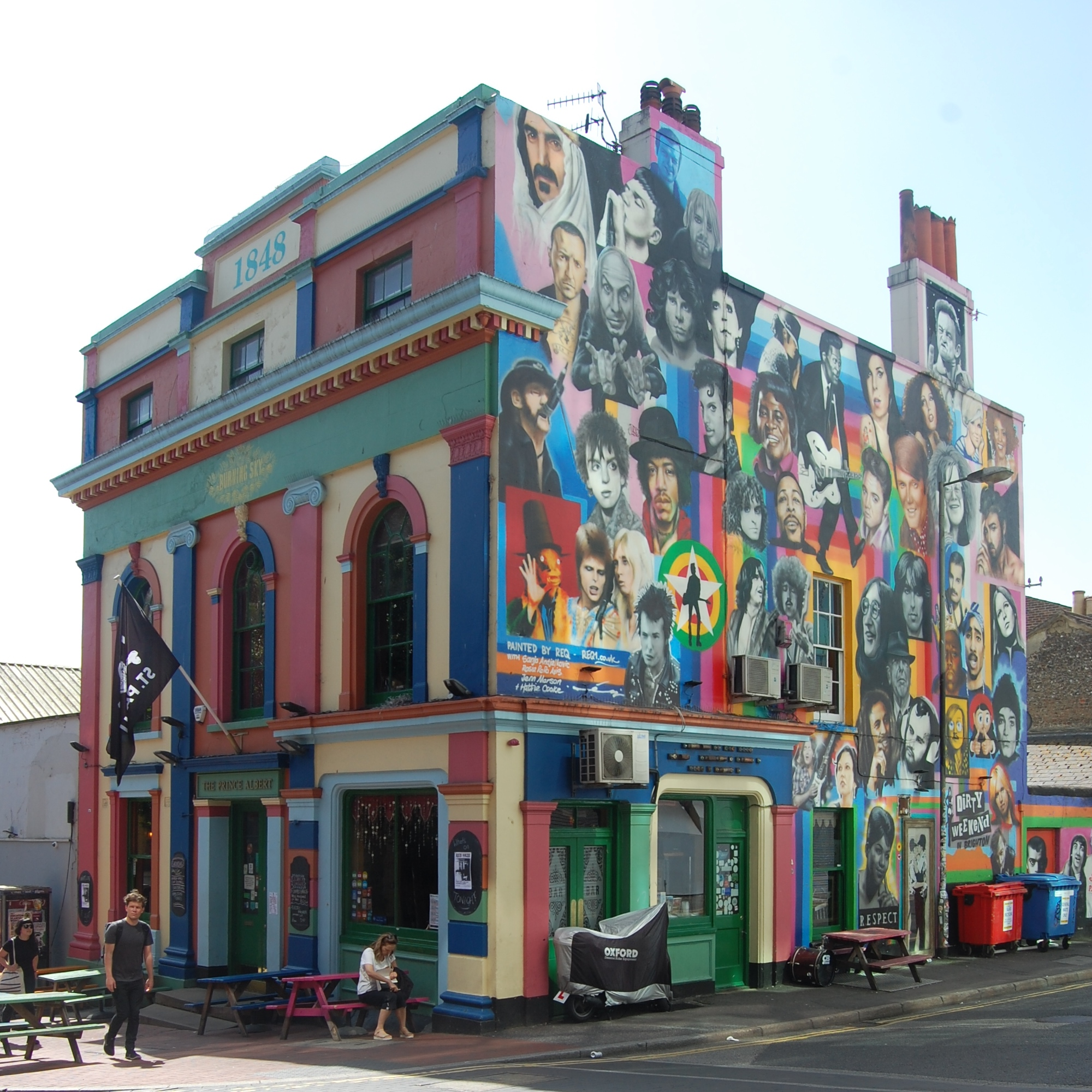
The mid-19th-century Prince Albert pub in the North Laine has a Banksy mural and prominent artwork depicting deceased musicians.

As of February 2001, there were 1,124 listed buildings with Grade II status in the English city of Brighton and Hove. The total at 2009 was similar. The city, on the English Channel coast approximately 52 miles (84 km) south of London, was formed as a unitary authority in 1997 by the merger of the neighbouring towns of Brighton and Hove. Queen Elizabeth II granted city status in 2000.

In England, a building or structure is defined as "listed" when it is placed on a statutory register of buildings of "special architectural or historic interest" by the Secretary of State for Culture, Media and Sport, a Government department, in accordance with the Planning (Listed Buildings and Conservation Areas) Act 1990. English Heritage, a non-departmental public body, acts as an agency of this department to administer the process and advise the department on relevant issues. There are three grades of listing status. The Grade II designation is the lowest, and is used for "nationally important buildings of special interest". Grade II* is used for "particularly important buildings of more than special interest"; there are 69 such buildings in the city. There are also 24 Grade I listed buildings (defined as being of "exceptional interest" and greater than national importance, and the highest of the three grades) in Brighton and Hove.

This list summarises 123 Grade II-listed buildings and structures whose names begin with P, Q or R. Numbered buildings with no individual name are listed by the name of the street they stand on. Some listings include contributory fixtures such as surrounding walls or railings in front of the building. These are summarised by notes alongside the building name.

== Listed buildings ==
Contributory fixtures
Note	Listing includes
^{[A]}	Attached railings
^{[B]}	Attached railings and carriage arch
^{[C]}	Attached walls
^{[D]}	Attached walls and piers
^{[E]}	Attached walls and railings
^{[F]}	Attached walls, piers and railings

Building name	Area	Image	Notes	Refs
7–19 Palmeira Mansions (More images)	Hove; 50.8269°N 0.1627°W		.	
21–31 Palmeira Mansions (More images)	Hove; 50.8271°N 0.1637°W		.	
1–17 Palmeira Square^{[A]} (More images)	Hove; 50.8263°N 0.1629°W		.	
18–30 Palmeira Square^{[A]} (More images)	Hove; 50.8265°N 0.1640°W		.	
Parochial Offices (former) (More images)	Kemptown; 50.8222°N 0.1358°W		.	
Park Street Gate^{[F]} (More images)	Queen's Park; 50.8232°N 0.1268°W		Queen's Park opened as Brighton Park in 1823 and was given two triumphal arch entrances in the late 19th century. In 1890 Francis May designed both Egremont Gate and the less ornate Park Gate, which is built of artificial stone with a tall central arch to the road and flat-arched side entrances for pedestrians. The main arch has an architrave with a prominent keystone, a dentil cornice and an inscribed panel naming the trustees who were responsible for giving the park to the residents of Brighton.	
Patcham Court Farmhouse	Patcham; 50.8673°N 0.1512°W		.	
4–7 Pavilion Buildings	Brighton; 50.8221°N 0.1382°W		.	
12–14 Pavilion Buildings (More images)	Brighton; 50.8216°N 0.1382°W		.	
3 and 4 Pavilion Parade^{[A]}	Brighton; 50.8227°N 0.1360°W		.	
5 Pavilion Parade	Brighton; 50.8227°N 0.1361°W		.	
6–11 Pavilion Parade	Brighton; 50.8224°N 0.1362°W		.	
Pavilion Theatre (More images)	North Laine; 50.8236°N 0.1391°W		.	
Pearson House	Kemptown; 50.8185°N 0.1205°W		.	
Pelham Institute (former) (More images)	Kemptown; 50.8200°N 0.1262°W		.	
1–7 Pelham Square	North Laine; 50.8277°N 0.1364°W		.	
8–12 Pelham Square^{[A]}	North Laine; 50.8275°N 0.1369°W		.	
15–24 Pelham Square	North Laine; 50.8277°N 0.1371°W		.	
25 Pelham Square	North Laine; 50.8280°N 0.1370°W		.	
Pennant Lodge^{[F]}	Queen's Park; 50.8266°N 0.1253°W		.	
Pepper Pot (More images)	Queen's Park; 50.8273°N 0.1248°W		.	
1–8 Percival Terrace^{[A]} (More images)	Kemp Town; 50.8166°N 0.1164°W		.	
Percy and Wagner Almshouses (More images)	Brighton; 50.8317°N 0.1297°W		.	
Phoenix Brewery office (former) (More images)	Brighton; 50.8289°N 0.1333°W		.	
Pillar Box at Montpelier Road (More images)	Brighton; 50.8248°N 0.1530°W		This pillar box is a First National Standard type dating from 1859 and cast by the Cochrane Grove & Co. foundry in Dudley. Such boxes are very rare, but this example is believed to be the only "anonymous" one in the United Kingdom, lacking any Royal cypher or any emblem indicating that it belongs to the General Post Office. It is a cylindrical cast iron box on a moulded plinth, topped with a shallow dome immediately above the narrow slot.	
Port Hall^{[C]}	Prestonville; 50.8359°N 0.1517°W		.	
1–11 Portland Place^{[F]}	Kemptown; 50.8180°N 0.1209°W		.	
15–25 Portland Place^{[A]}	Kemptown; 50.8179°N 0.1204°W		.	
Portslade railway station^{[C]} (More images)	Portslade; 50.8357°N 0.2052°W		.	
Post Office (former), College Road^{[F]}	Kemptown; 50.8194°N 0.1231°W		.	
Post Office (former), Ship Street (More images)	The Lanes; 50.8227°N 0.1416°W		.	
Post on pavement outside 77 and 78 West Street	Brighton; 50.8213°N 0.1444°W		.	
1–11 Powis Square^{[A]}	Montpelier; 50.8278°N 0.1487°W		.	
12 Powis Square^{[A]}	Montpelier; 50.8275°N 0.1483°W		.	
13 Powis Square^{[A]}	Montpelier; 50.8274°N 0.1483°W		.	
14–24 Powis Square^{[A]}	Montpelier; 50.8274°N 0.1490°W		.	
2 Powis Villas^{[C]}	Montpelier; 50.8273°N 0.1482°W		.	
3 Powis Villas^{[C]}	Montpelier; 50.8275°N 0.1480°W		.	
4 Powis Villas	Montpelier; 50.8277°N 0.1479°W		.	
5 Powis Villas^{[C]}	Montpelier; 50.8276°N 0.1475°W		.	
6 and 7 Powis Villas^{[C]}	Montpelier; 50.8274°N 0.1477°W		.	
8 and 9 Powis Villas^{[C]}	Montpelier; 50.8272°N 0.1478°W		.	
10–13 Powis Villas^{[C]}	Montpelier; 50.8270°N 0.1480°W		.	
Pressley's	Brighton; 50.8217°N 0.1380°W		.	
199 Preston Road	Preston Village; 50.8426°N 0.1516°W		.	
5 Preston Street	Brighton; 50.8224°N 0.1518°W		.	
58 Preston Street	Brighton; 50.8241°N 0.1506°W		.	
60 Preston Street	Brighton; 50.8240°N 0.1506°W		.	
79 Preston Street^{[A]}	Brighton; 50.8227°N 0.1513°W		.	
Prince Albert pub (More images)	North Laine; 50.8284°N 0.1407°W		.	
1 Prince Albert Street	The Lanes; 50.8210°N 0.1405°W		.	
2–8 Prince Albert Street	The Lanes; 50.8210°N 0.1409°W		.	
10 Prince Albert Street	The Lanes; 50.8214°N 0.1412°W		.	
11–13 Prince Albert Street	The Lanes; 50.8215°N 0.1413°W		.	
15 Prince Albert Street^{[A]}	The Lanes; 50.8217°N 0.1411°W		.	
15b Prince Albert Street	The Lanes; 50.8217°N 0.1412°W		.	
16 Prince Albert Street	The Lanes; 50.8214°N 0.1410°W		.	
17 and 17a Prince Albert Street	The Lanes; 50.8213°N 0.1409°W		.	
18 and 19 Prince Albert Street	The Lanes; 50.8213°N 0.1408°W		.	
20, 21, 21a and 21b Prince Albert Street	The Lanes; 50.8212°N 0.1407°W		.	
24 Prince Albert Street	The Lanes; 50.8212°N 0.1404°W		.	
Princes House (More images)	Brighton; 50.8224°N 0.1391°W		.	
18–20 Princes Street^{[A]}	Kemptown; 50.8219°N 0.1360°W		.	
Prospect Cottage (More images)	Rottingdean; 50.8064°N 0.0592°W		.	
Puget's Cottage	Brighton; 50.8222°N 0.1398°W		.	
Pump House Tavern (More images)	The Lanes; 50.8215°N 0.1402°W		.	
Pylon on east side of London Road	Patcham; 50.8806°N 0.1651°W		.	
Pylon on west side of London Road	Patcham; 50.8806°N 0.1654°W		.	
The Quadrant pub	Brighton; 50.8241°N 0.1435°W		.	
Queens Hotel (eastern wing)	Brighton; 50.8198°N 0.1392°W		.	
4–9 Queens Place (More images)	Brighton; 50.8298°N 0.1351°W		.	
27 Queens Road^{[A]} (More images)	Brighton; 50.8258°N 0.1427°W		.	
Railings at Marine Parade	East Cliff; 50.8167°N 0.1189°W		.	
Railings at Queens Road Rest Garden (east side)	Brighton; 50.8254°N 0.1426°W		.	
Railings at Queens Road Rest Garden (south side)	Brighton; 50.8252°N 0.1427°W		.	
Railings at The Esplanade	Brighton; 50.8223°N 0.1558°W		.	
Railings on west side of Queen's Road	Brighton; 50.8258°N 0.1426°W		.	
Ralli Hall (More images)	Hove; 50.8346°N 0.1699°W		.	
Ray Mausoleum at Brighton Extramural Cemetery	Brighton; 50.8369°N 0.1202°W		.	
Rectory Cottage (More images)	Ovingdean; 50.8159°N 0.0771°W		.	
Rectory Lodge	Ovingdean; 50.8160°N 0.0770°W		.	
10 and 11 Regency Mews	Brighton; 50.8235°N 0.1508°W		.	
22–25 Regency Square and 67 Preston Street^{[A]}	Brighton; 50.8234°N 0.1509°W		.	
38–46 Regency Square^{[B]}	Brighton; 50.8231°N 0.1493°W		.	
46a Regency Square	Brighton; 50.8230°N 0.1489°W		.	
46b Regency Square	Brighton; 50.8229°N 0.1489°W		.	
47–49 Regency Square^{[A]}	Brighton; 50.8229°N 0.1491°W		.	
Regency Tavern (More images)	Brighton; 50.8229°N 0.1488°W		.	
18–20 Regent Hill	Brighton; 50.8247°N 0.1466°W		.	
1–3 Richmond Terrace^{[F]}	Brighton; 50.8292°N 0.1334°W		.	
4–6 Richmond Terrace^{[A]}	Brighton; 50.8294°N 0.1331°W		.	
7 Richmond Terrace^{[D]}	Brighton; 50.8295°N 0.1330°W		.	
11–14 Richmond Terrace^{[D]}	Brighton; 50.8300°N 0.1323°W		.	
15 Richmond Terrace^{[A]}	Brighton; 50.8302°N 0.1321°W		.	
16 Richmond Terrace	Brighton; 50.8303°N 0.1320°W		.	
17 and 18 Richmond Terrace^{[C]}	Brighton; 50.8304°N 0.1318°W		.	
Robin's Row	Portslade; 50.8422°N 0.2201°W		.	
Roedean School (More images)	Roedean; 50.8120°N 0.0841°W		.	
Rokesley House and Grosvenor House^{[A]}	East Cliff; 50.8180°N 0.1225°W		.	
Rookery Cottage	Hangleton; 50.8316°N 0.1679°W		.	
Rottingdean Club	Rottingdean; 50.8056°N 0.0587°W		.	
1–13 Roundhill Crescent^{[A]}	Round Hill; 50.8350°N 0.1297°W		.	
19 and 21 Roundhill Crescent^{[A]}	Round Hill; 50.8354°N 0.1296°W		.	
23–27 Roundhill Crescent^{[A]}	Round Hill; 50.8357°N 0.1294°W		.	
69 and 71 Roundhill Crescent^{[A]}	Round Hill; 50.8364°N 0.1284°W		.	
101–113 Roundhill Crescent^{[A]}	Round Hill; 50.8367°N 0.1268°W		.	
Royal Albion Hotel (western wing) (More images)	Brighton; 50.8198°N 0.1373°W		.	
Royal Crescent Mansions^{[E]} (More images)	East Cliff; 50.8182°N 0.1245°W		.	
Royal Gymnasium (former)^{[A]} (More images)	Kemptown; 50.8187°N 0.1185°W		.	
Royal Mail Sorting Office	Brighton; 50.8251°N 0.1419°W		.	
Royal Pavilion Tavern^{[A]} (More images)	Brighton; 50.8214°N 0.1385°W		.	
Royal Sovereign pub (More images)	Brighton; 50.8237°N 0.1508°W		.	
Royal Spa	Queen's Park; 50.8234°N 0.1271°W		.	
Royal Sussex County Hospital Chapel	Kemptown; 50.8196°N 0.1183°W		.	
Royal York Buildings (More images)	Brighton; 50.8202°N 0.1382°W		.	
Ruin and grotto at St Mary's Convent	Portslade; 50.8433°N 0.2176°W		.	
3, 5 and 7 Russell Crescent^{[E]}	Prestonville; 50.8324°N 0.1481°W		.	
22 and 23 Russell Square	Brighton; 50.8232°N 0.1483°W		.	
25 Russell Square	Brighton; 50.8232°N 0.1485°W		.	
28–31 Russell Square^{[A]}	Brighton; 50.8231°N 0.1487°W		.	
35 Russell Square	Brighton; 50.8229°N 0.1487°W		.	
36–45 Russell Square^{[A]}	Brighton; 50.8229°N 0.1484°W		.	
46 Russell Square	Brighton; 50.8228°N 0.1477°W		.	

== See also ==
- Buildings and architecture of Brighton and Hove
- Grade I listed buildings in Brighton and Hove
- Grade II* listed buildings in Brighton and Hove
- List of conservation areas in Brighton and Hove
