= Palmeira Square =

19th century residences in Hove, England

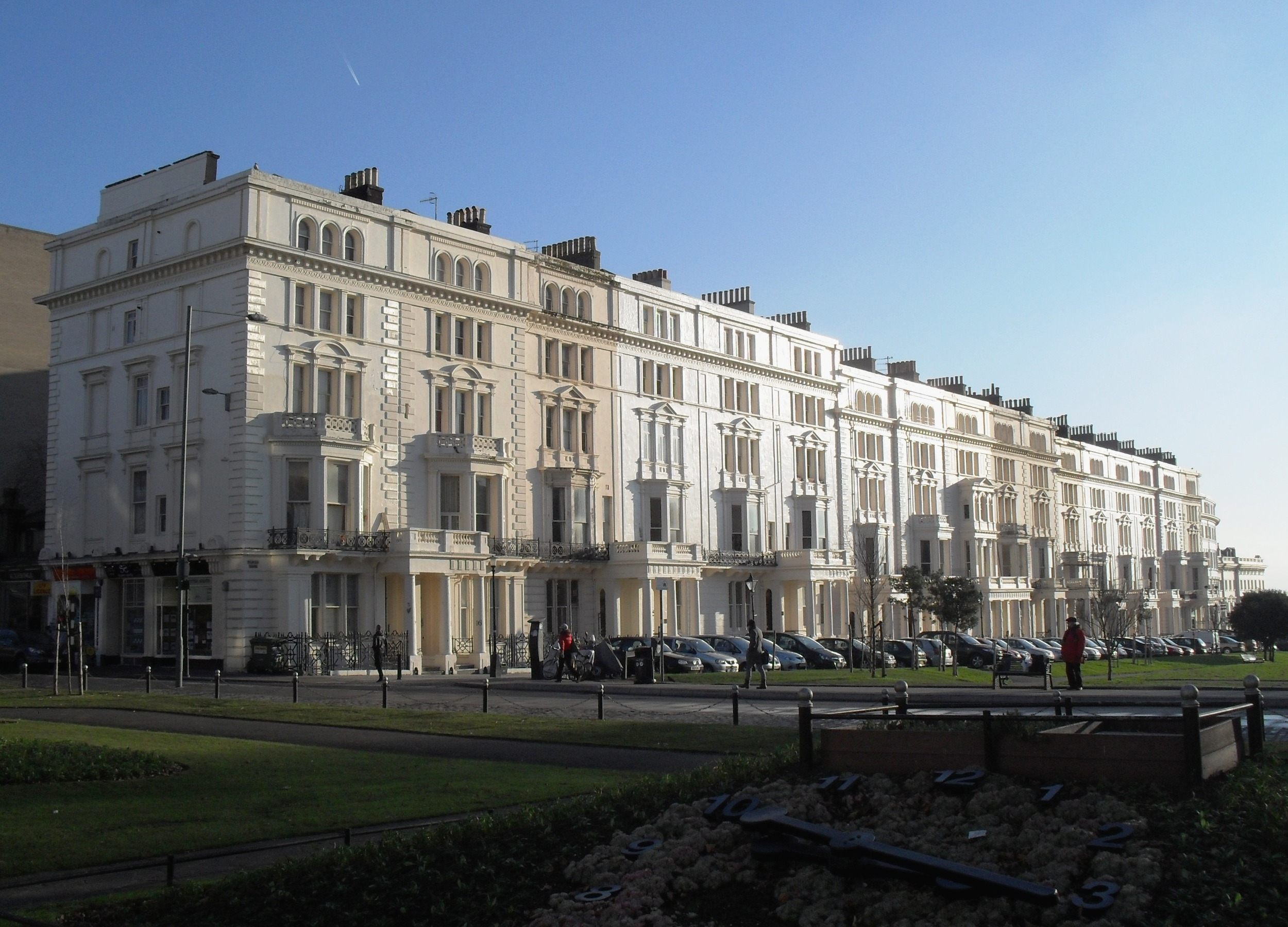
- The east side of the square seen from the north

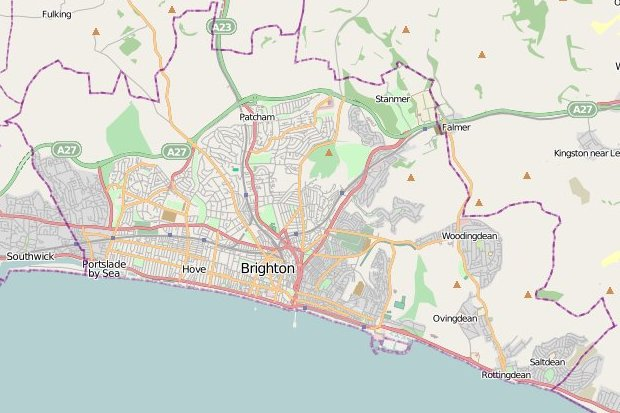
- Location within Brighton and Hove
- 50.8259°N 0.1636°W
- Location: Palmeira Square, Hove, Brighton and Hove, United Kingdom

History
- Built: c. 1855–c. 1870
- Built for: Sir Isaac Goldsmid, 1st Baronet

Site notes
- Architectural style: Victorian/Italianate

Listed Building – Grade II*
- Official name: 33 Palmeira Mansions
- Designated: 18 July 1978
- Reference no.: 1204933

Listed Building – Grade II
- Official name: 1–17 Palmeira Square and attached railings; 18–30 Palmeira Square and attached railings; 7–19 Palmeira Mansions; 21–31 Palmeira Mansions
- Designated: 10 September 1971; 4 February 1981
- Reference no.: 1298646; 1187581; 1187548; 1187549

Palmeira Square (/pælˈmɪərə/) is a mid-19th-century residential development in Hove, part of the English city and seaside resort of Brighton and Hove. At the southern end it adjoins Adelaide Crescent, another architectural set-piece which leads down to the seafront; large terraced houses occupy its west and east sides, separated by a public garden; and at the north end is one of Hove's main road junctions. This is also called Palmeira Square, and its north side is lined with late 19th-century terraced mansions. Commercial buildings and a church also stand on the main road, which is served by Brighton & Hove bus routes1, 1X, N1, 2, 5, 5A, 5B, N5, 6, 25, 46, 49, 60 71,71A and 96.

The land was originally occupied by "the world's largest conservatory", the Anthaeum—a visitor attraction planned by botanist, author and building promoter Henry Phillips. The giant dome's collapse and total destruction on the day it was due to open in 1833 made Phillips go blind from shock, and the debris occupied the site for many years. Work began in the early 1850s and was largely complete in the mid-1860s, although commercial and residential buildings such as Palmeira House and Gwydyr Mansions continued to be added at the northern end throughout the late 19th century. English Heritage has listed the residential buildings on the western, eastern and northern sides of the square at Grade II for their architectural and historical importance, although one building has the higher Grade II* status because of its opulent custom-designed interior.

== History ==
The ancient parish of Hove covered 778 acres (315 ha) of good agricultural land on the southern slopes of the South Downs, leading down to the English Channel. There was Celtic and Roman occupation of the area, and a Bronze Age barrow was found close to Palmeira Square's northern end when the land was being developed. Inside was a wooden coffin, a stone axe, a bronze dagger and the Hove amber cup, a relic of international significance now held at the Brighton Museum & Art Gallery. Some estimates dated the barrow as early as 1500 BC, but radiocarbon dating indicates the burial took place in about 1239 BC.

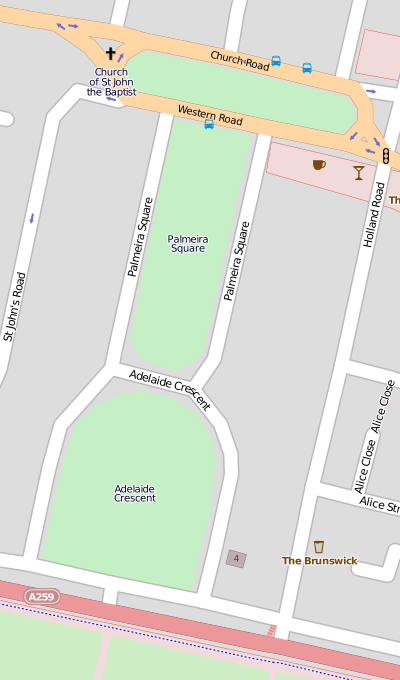
Palmeira Square lies north of Adelaide Crescent. Church Road and Western Road form its northern side.

One of the main farms was Wick Farm, which covered about 250 acres (100 ha) of land immediately west of the parish boundary with Brighton. The first post-Norman Conquest landowners were the de Pierpoints; in 1573 the estate was bought by the Stapley family, of which Anthony Stapley became famous as one of the regicides of King Charles I. In 1701 it was acquired by the Scutt family from Brighton. Western Road and its continuation Church Road, the earliest east–west route through Hove, bisected the estate.

On the land was a chalybeate spring, later called St Ann's Well, which became a popular visitor attraction by the mid-18th century. In the early 19th century, its fashionable reputation increased as neighbouring Brighton began to grow rapidly as a high-class seaside resort. Following the lead of Queen Adelaide, who would ride to St Ann's Well to visit the spa and take the waters, wealthy residents and visitors to Brighton travelled across the parish boundary to walk round the gardens, visit the ornate pump-room and enjoy the apparently health-giving properties of the iron-rich water.

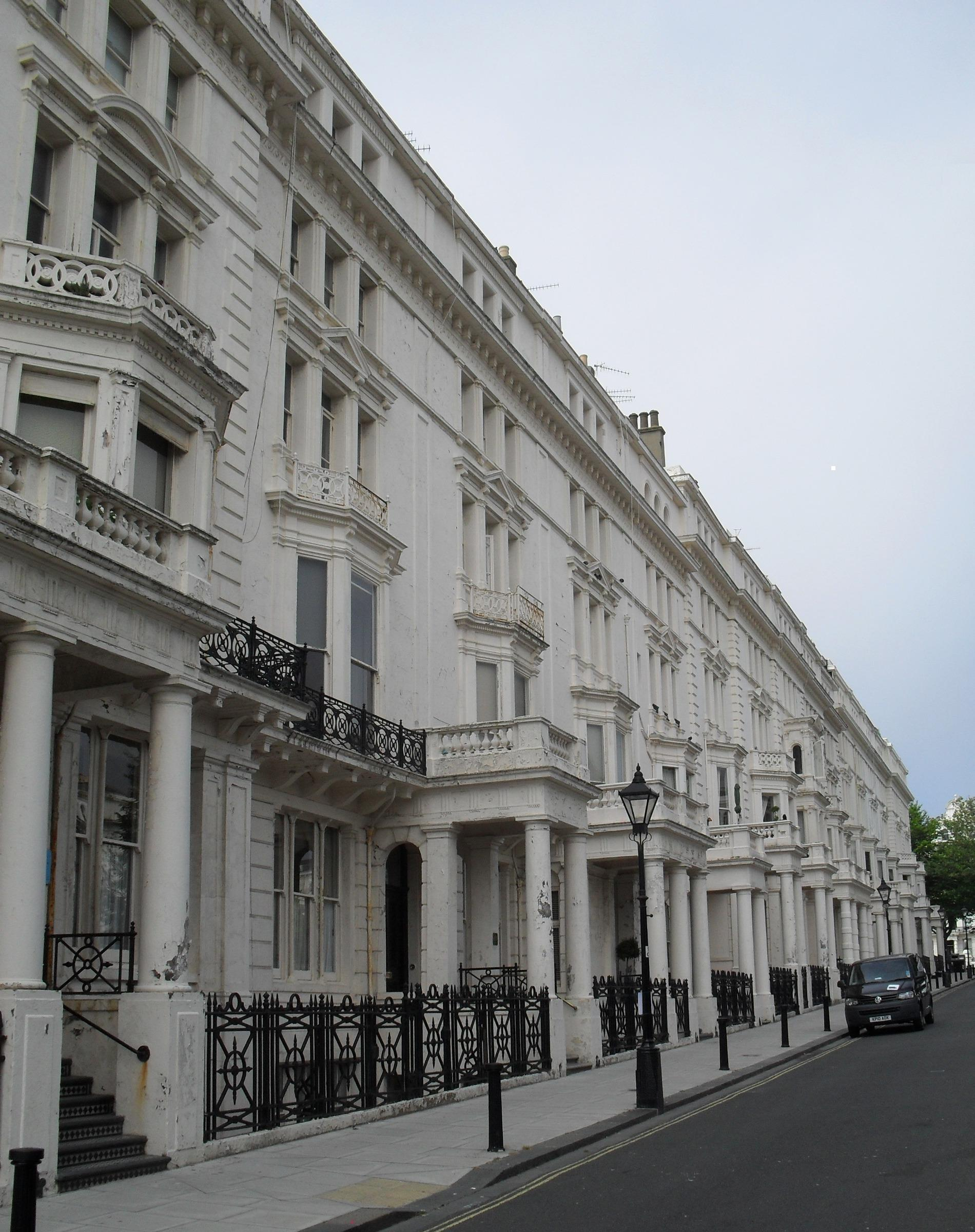
The houses on the west side were completed first.

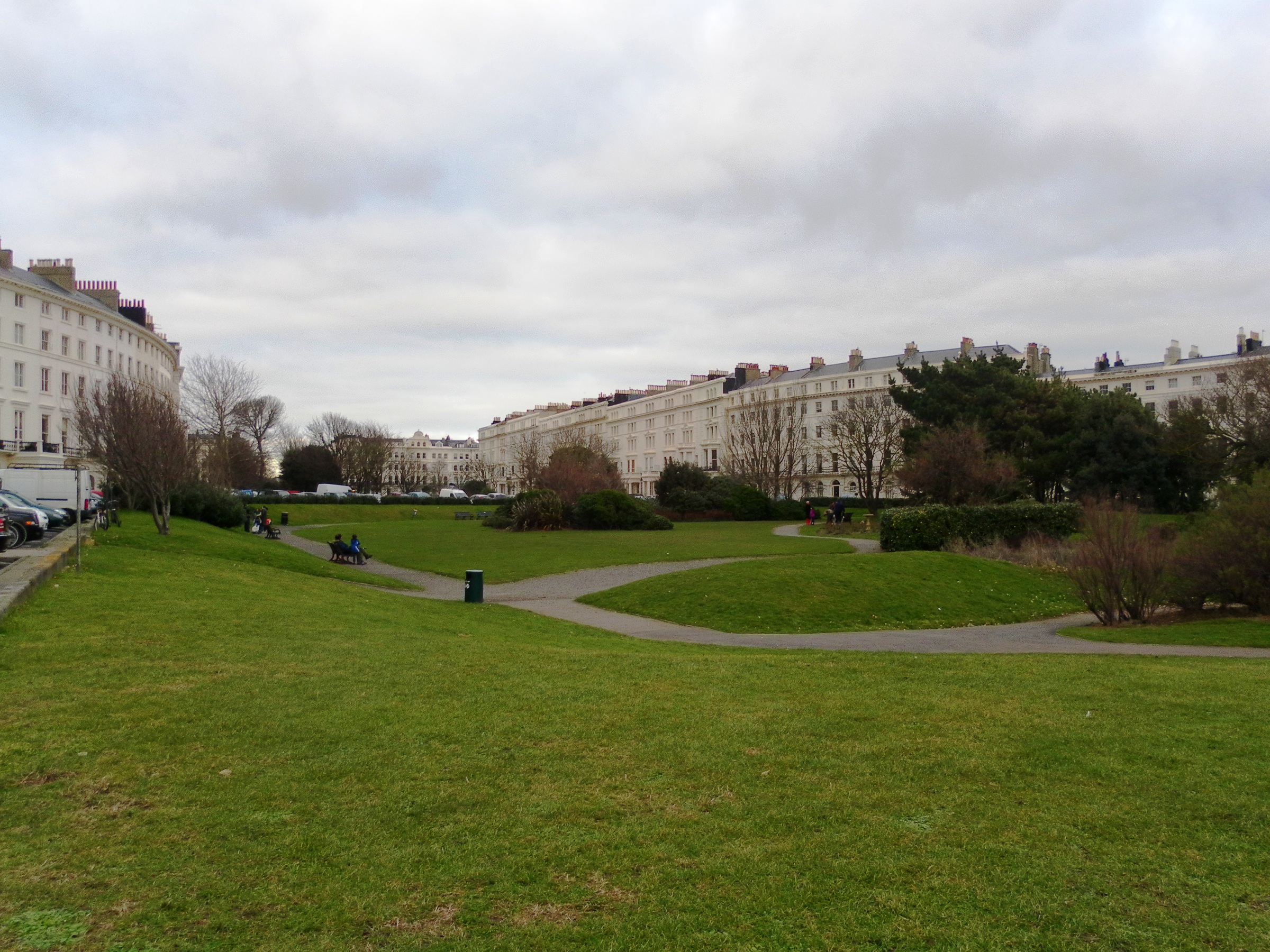
An "elegantly handled ... double curve" marks the transition from Adelaide Crescent (foreground) to Palmeira Square. The Enclosures belonging to the houses have pathways and shrubs.

Rev. Thomas Scutt, who owned the Wick Estate land by the 1820s, started to sell plots of land to "capitalis[e] on the insatiable demand for building land along the seafront". Brunswick Town was the first result of this, and when Sir Isaac Goldsmid, 1st Baronet, bought the rest of the land (over 216 acres (87 ha)) in 1830 he continued Hove's residential expansion by commissioning Decimus Burton to design Adelaide Crescent and by agreeing to fund the construction of "the world's largest dome" at its northern end. The ostentatious Anthaeum, proposed by botanist and horticultural writer Henry Phillips and designed by prominent local architect Amon Henry Wilds, was to have been a vast circular conservatory containing exotic plants and trees. It was built between 1832 and 1833 but collapsed spectacularly the day before its scheduled opening date, making Phillips go blind from shock and apparently distressing Goldsmid so much that he abandoned any further plans for development of his land for 20 years—during which time the wrecked glass and iron structure lay where it fell at the north end of the incomplete Adelaide Crescent.

In the early 1850s, Goldsmid (who had been given the title Baron de Goldsmid e de Palmeira by the Queen of Portugal in 1845) decided to restart development at Adelaide Crescent. He abandoned the original plan for a horseshoe-shape plan and in 1851 commissioned an unknown architect to extend it northwards into a bottle shape, north of which (on the site of the Anthaeum) would be a new residential square: Palmeira Square. The remains of the Anthaeum were cleared in the early 1850s (or possibly as late as 1855), and work began.

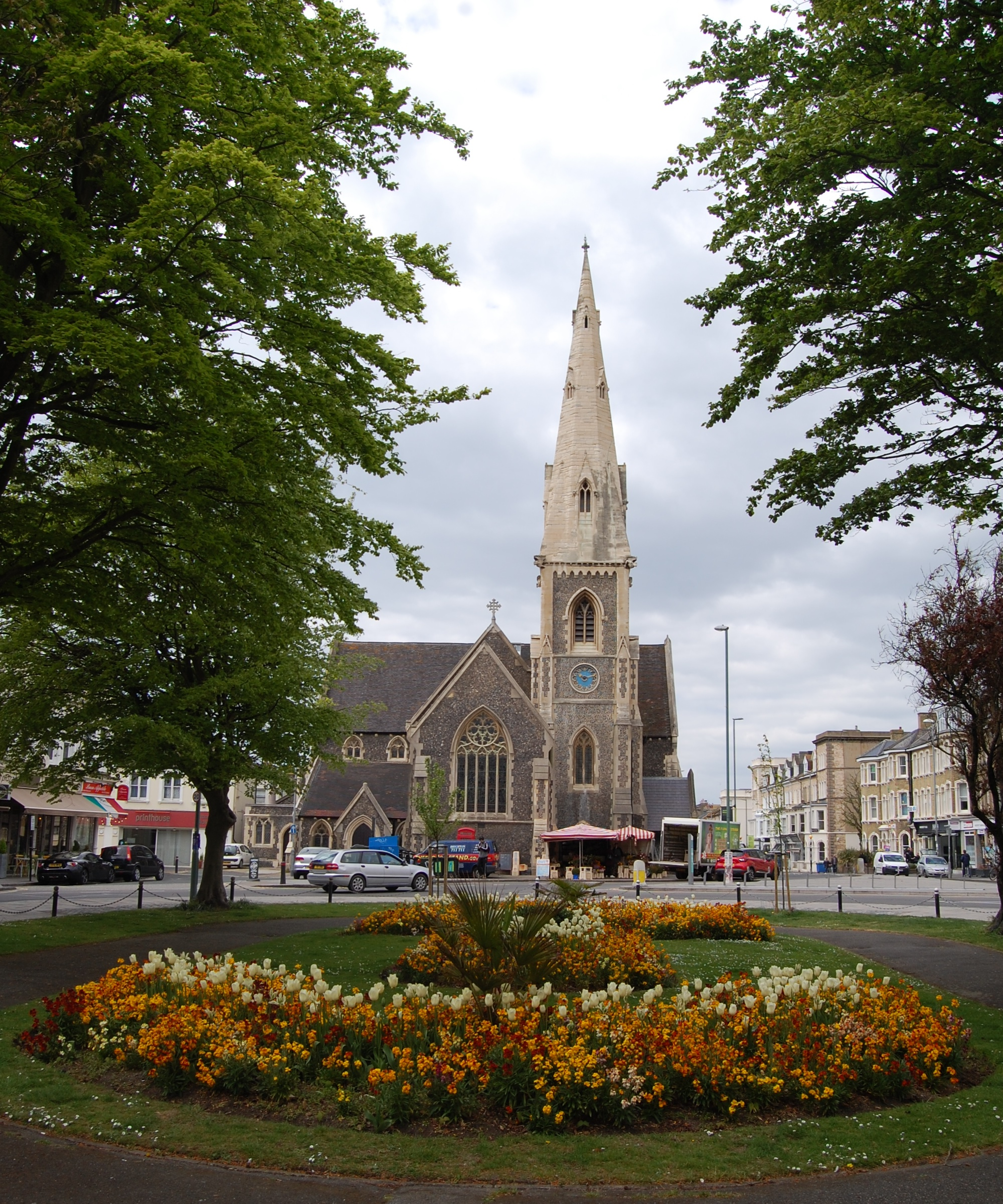
St John the Baptist's Church (seen from Palmeira Square Gardens) serves the area.

Houses on the west side of the square, close to the western boundary of the Wick Estate land, were the first to be built. The southernmost houses on each side are attached to the north end of Adelaide Crescent, which was completed in the early 1860s; "the transition from crescent into square is most elegantly handled in a double curve". Between 1855 and 1870, 34 houses were built, all in the same "vigorous and healthy" post-Regency Victorian/Italianate style. It took several years for the houses to be occupied. Numbers 33 and 34 on the west side were the first to be taken, in 1859, and by 1866 none of the 17 houses on that side were empty. The first house on the east side was let in 1864, and it took ten years for the whole square to be occupied. Early residents included a wine merchant, a factory owner, and Lady Emily Fletcher who shared the house with her mother, five children and nine servants.

An Anglican church to serve the area was provided in 1854. St John the Baptist's Church, a flint-built Decorated Gothic Revival building with a landmark spire, was designed by William and Edward Habershon. Work began in 1852, and the site (at the northwest corner of Palmeira Square, where it joined Church Road) "compels traffic to take an abrupt turn before proceeding westward". It may have been built there to block attempts to build a road north from the Palmeira Square area into the mostly undeveloped land to the north which later became the Cliftonville area of Hove. In keeping with the high-class surroundings, the church was "for many years one of the most fashionable" in either Brighton or Hove.

The houses of Palmeira Square were separated from Church Road by a private road which ran parallel (east–west) to the main road, creating a second square of open space. Only residents of Palmeira Square and Adelaide Crescent could gain entry to it; there was a chain across each entrance and a watchman controlled admission. Church Road itself was laid out as a thoroughfare in 1851; until then it had been a footpath. In the same year, an Act of Parliament (the Brunswick Square Improvement Extension Act) was passed to bring Palmeira Square and nearby developments into the jurisdiction of the Brunswick Square Commissioners. Had this Act not been passed, the square would have been governed solely by "the rather nebulous authority of the Parish officials of Hove". One consequence was that Sir Francis Goldsmid (who inherited his father Sir Isaac's estate on 1859) was able to delegate responsibility for the maintenance of the Palmeira Square Enclosure (the garden between the west and east sides) to the Brunswick Square Commissioners from April 1865. Previously Goldsmid himself had to employ and pay a gardener.

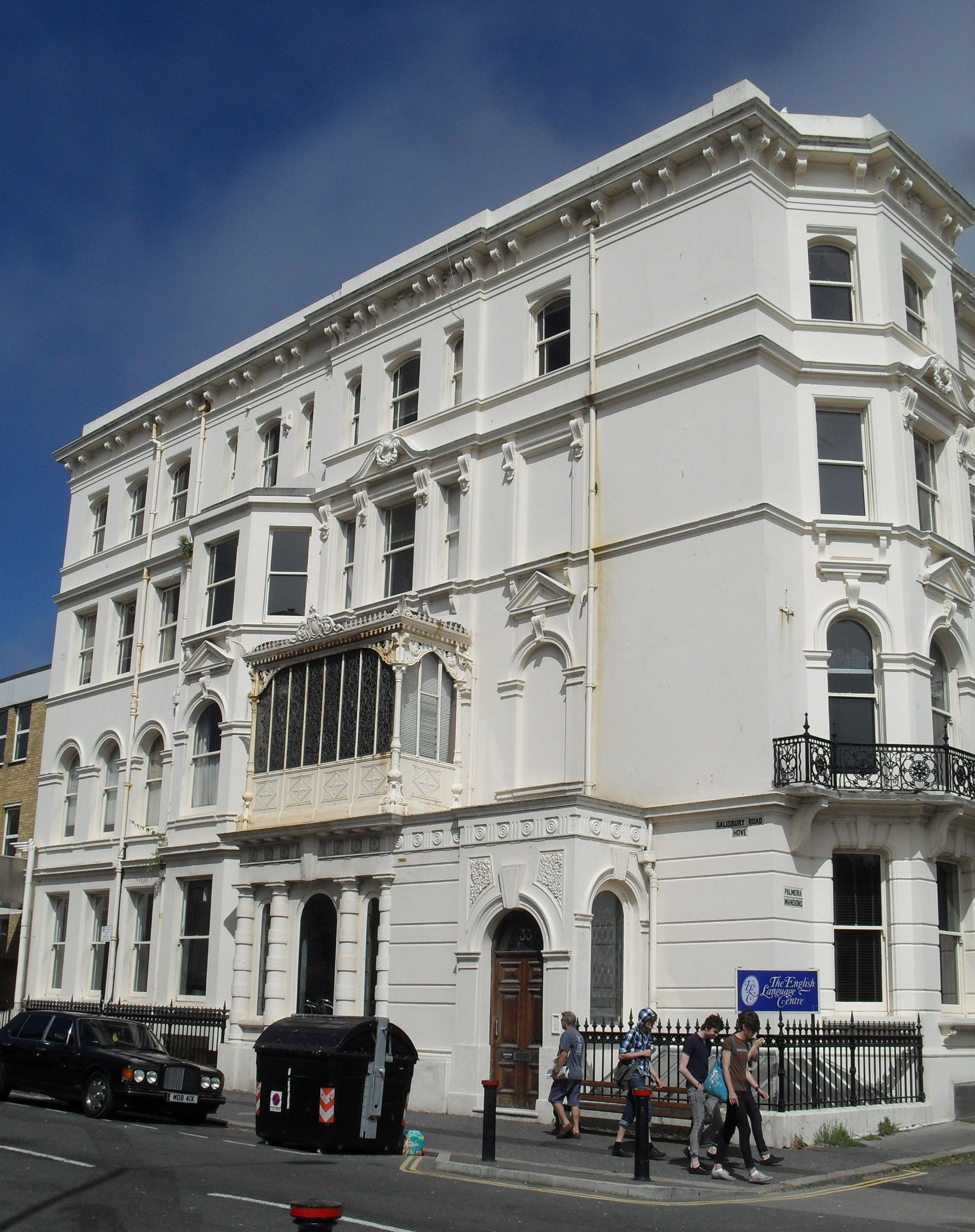
33 Palmeira Mansions has an ostentatious late Victorian interior.

In 1891, the Hove Commissioners (who now had civic responsibility for the square) tried to make the private road north of the square a public thoroughfare by removing the barriers. Objections from the residents delayed this plan for several years, but the road did eventually open to the public. Accordingly, the land to the north was now considered part of the Palmeira Square area, and the development as a whole consists of two garden squares. The first is the original development bounded to the south by Adelaide Crescent, to the north by the former private road which is now a widened continuation of Western Road and to the west by the 34 houses of the square. The second is the lawned section formed by the junction between the extension of Western Road, Church Road and the connections between them, and all the surrounding buildings of the late 19th century.

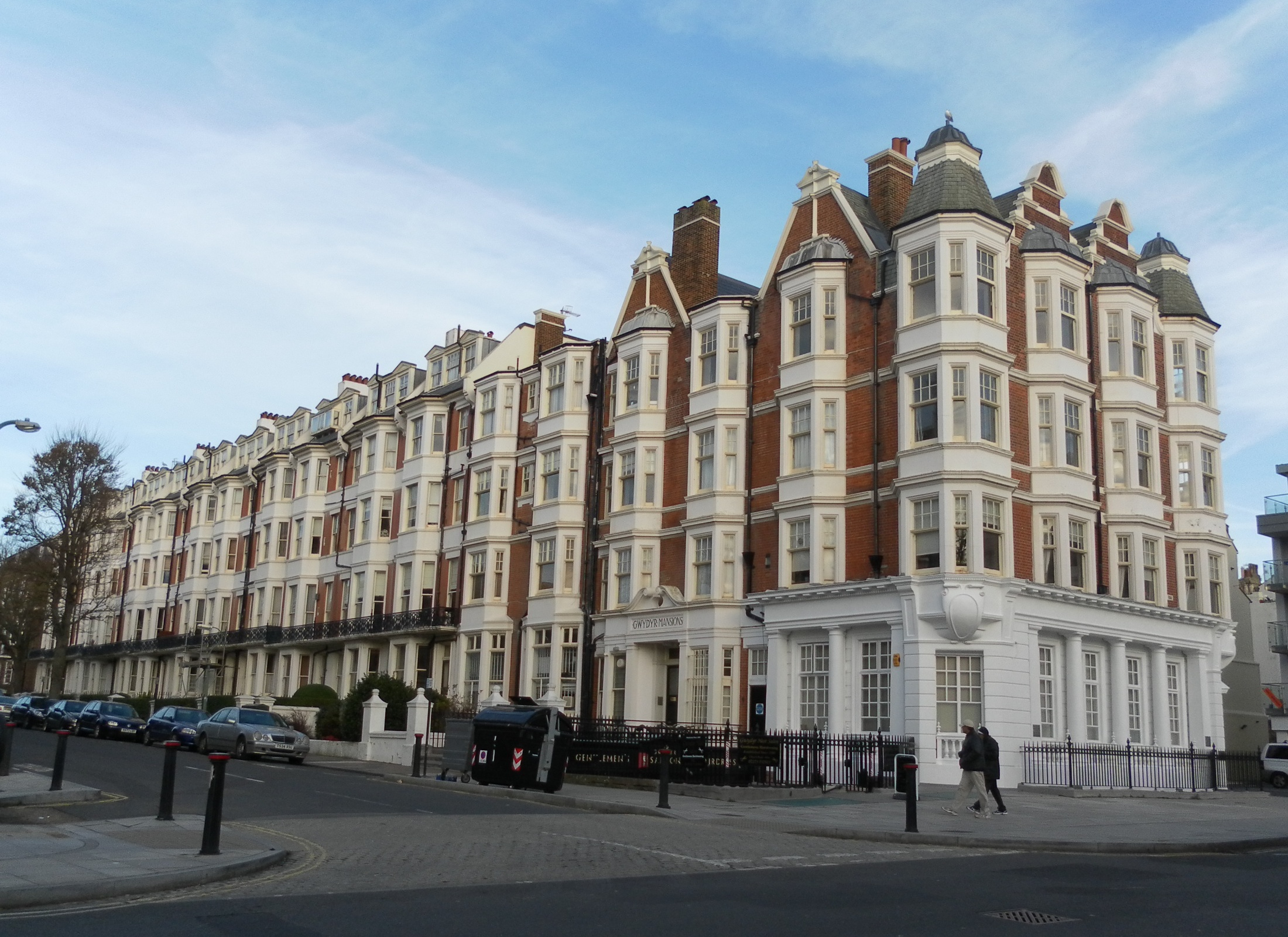
Gwydyr Mansions date from 1890.

The open land in between these roads was laid out with grass and was named the Palmeira Mansions Enclosures after the "very fine" Palmeira Mansions were built on the north side of Church Road in 1883–84, effectively forming a new north side to Palmeira Square. Local architect Henry Lanchester designed the mansions and Jabez Reynolds built them. Some of the houses were still unoccupied by 1891 because of a slowdown in the property market. Despite this slump, another local firm, Clayton & Black, designed Gwydyr Mansions on an adjacent site in 1890. The luxury flats, in a Flemish Renaissance Revival style which contrasts with their Italianate neighbours, had an integrated bank, barber's shop and residents' restaurant. In 1889, businessman A.W. Mason (owner of Mason's Ink) bought 33 Palmeira Mansions and in 1899 commissioned S. H. Diplock to give it a new interior according to "the most extreme Victorian theatrical taste". This building is now owned by The English Language Centre Brighton, a language school. Tours of the interior are a feature of the annual Brighton Fringe Festival.

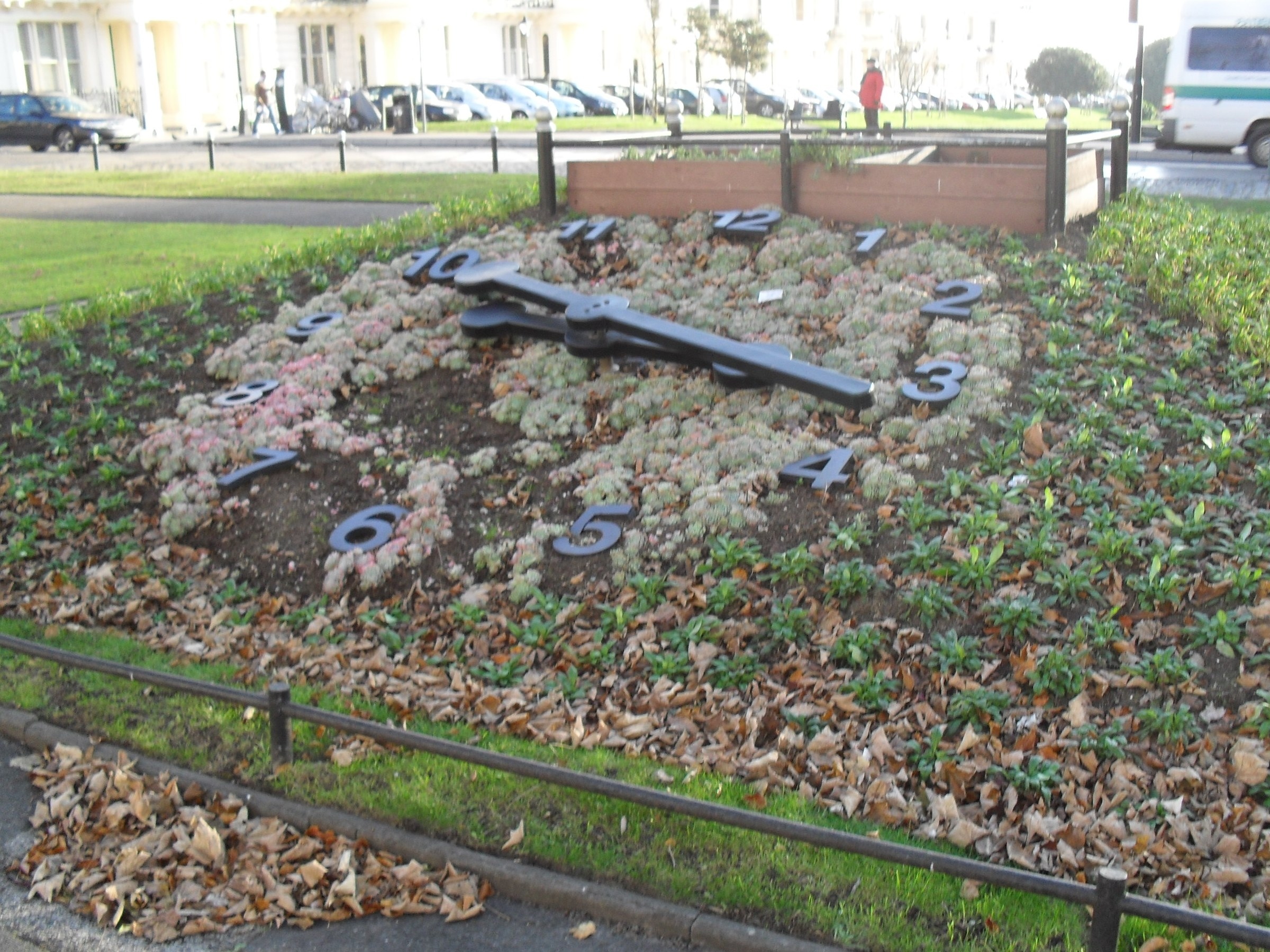
This floral clock was inaugurated in 1953.

On 2 June 1953—the day of the Coronation of Queen Elizabeth II—a floral clock commemorating the event was unveiled in the centre of the Palmeira Mansions Enclosures. Hove Council's Director of Parks and Cemeteries, G. A. Hyland, was the designer. Its slightly raised circular design may be a reference to the nearby Bronze Age barrow, which was destroyed by building work at the north end of the square in 1857. It was the only one on the Sussex coast and was larger than examples found on the South Downs. (The centre of the site is at 50.8275°N 0.1637°W, about 100 yards (91 m) north-northeast of St John the Baptist's Church). The clock had a double face—the first floral clock in the world to have this feature—each with a diameter of 9 feet (2.7 m). Clockmakers James Richie & Son, who had designed a floral clock in Edinburgh, provided the mechanism. About 35,000 flowers were initially planted, and special temporary floral designs were sometimes put in—for example, to commemorate Brighton & Hove Albion F.C.'s Football League Third Division South title win in 1958, the Queen's Silver Jubilee of 1977 and the Brighton and Hove in Bloom competition in 1998. Vandalism has been a recurrent problem since the 1980s, though.

According to a watercolour by an unknown artist (Adelaide Crescent and Palmeira Square, 1895) which was sold at auction in 2002, five tennis courts were intended for the Palmeira Square Enclosures. No work towards these plans was ever carried out.

Written in the original deeds to each house was a requirement that the exterior of the building and its attached railings and doors had to be painted every three years. This was updated in 1892 to state that "three coats of best oil paint" in a pale stone colour had to be used. Observance of this rule lapsed over time until Hove Council reinforced it in the 1970s—stating that magnolia paint had to be used. Other stipulations added at various times included the maximum number of flats each house could be converted into and a prohibition of drying laundry where it could be seen from outside. Many houses have been converted into flats, including numbers 2–5 (in 1919), 7 (1922), 8 (1921), 10 and 11 (1927), 20 (1932) and 30–34 (1904–10).

== Transport ==
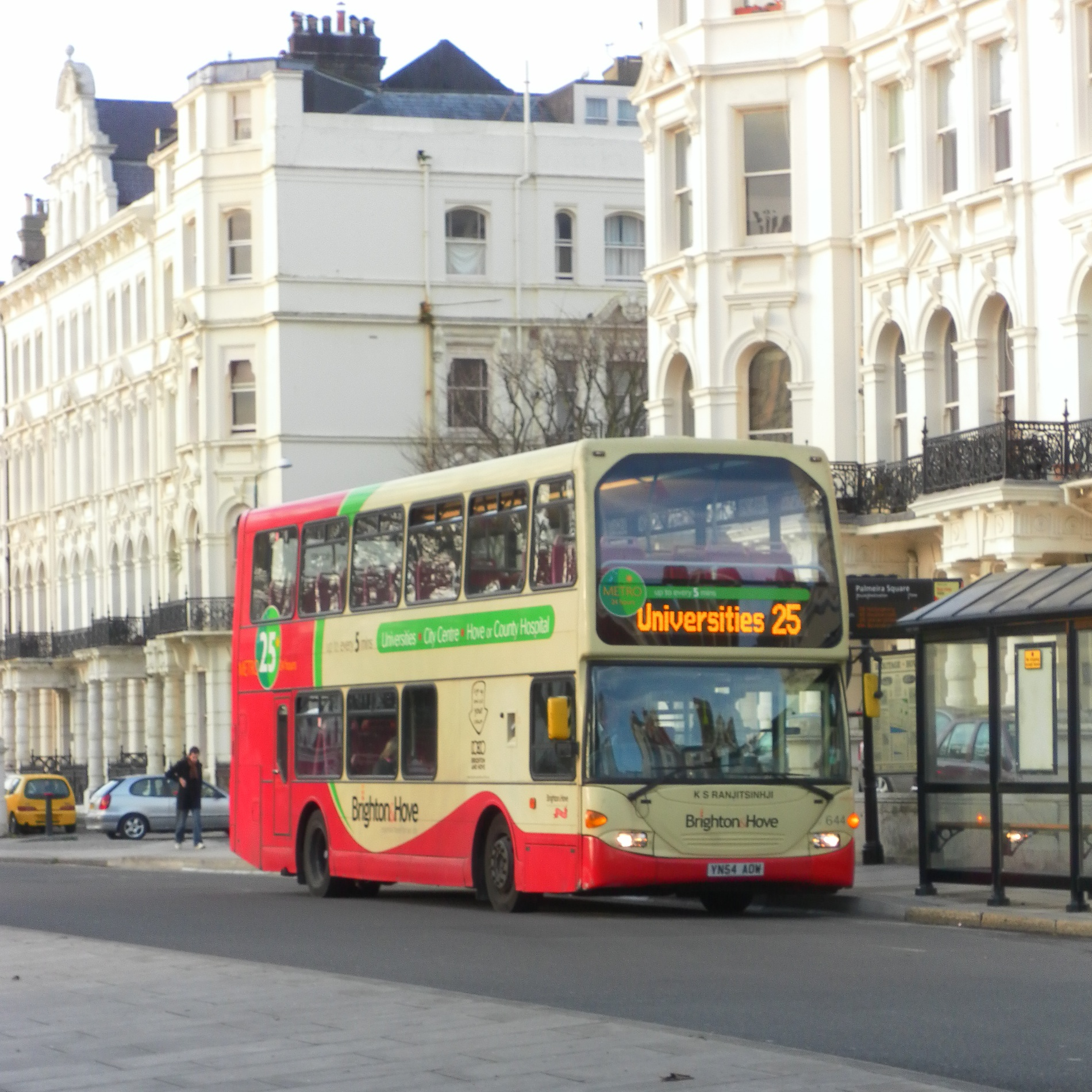
Palmeira Square is the starting point for route 25 to Sussex and Brighton Universities. Palmeira Mansions are in the background.

Palmeira Square is a key destination for the city's buses: many serve it en route to other destinations, and the high-frequency route 25 terminates there. The following routes, all operated by the Brighton & Hove bus company, stop at Palmeira Square:

- 1/1A (Mile Oak–Whitehawk)
- 2/2A (Shoreham-by-Sea/Steyning–Rottingdean)
- 5/5A/5B (Hangleton–Patcham/University of Sussex)
- 6 (Downs Park–Brighton railway station)
- 20X (Steyning–Old Steine)
- 25 (Palmeira Square–University of Sussex)
- 46 (Southwick–Hollingbury)
- 49 (Portslade railway station–East Moulsecoomb)
- 21/21A (Goldstone Valley/Sussex County Cricket Ground–Open Market/Meadowview)

The Coastliner 700 service from Brighton to Southsea, operated by Stagecoach South, also serves the square. The nearest railway station is Hove, 1 mile (1.6 km) to the north.

== Residents ==
Literary journalist Miron Grindea had a flat in number 1 Palmeira Square during the 1970s. Number 2 was home to Sir Isaac Goldsmid's daughter in the late 19th century. Lawyer and writer H. S. Cunningham kcie lived at number 3, and Sir Julian Goldsmid, 3rd Baronet lived next door at number 4; he died there in 1896. Architect John C.L. Iredel, a member of the Chichester Diocesan Panel of Architects who designed the former Emmanuel Church in Worthing in 1975–76 and restored Buxted parish church six years earlier, lived at number 8 and died there in 1990. On the east side of the square, Henry d'Avigdor-Goldsmid lived at number 18 during the 1950s. Lord George Montacute Nevill (son of William Nevill, 1st Marquess of Abergavenny) and his wife Florence owned number 22; he died there in 1920. Next door at number 23, William FitzClarence, 2nd Earl of Munster lived with his wife Wilhelmina Kennedy-Erskine. They were still living there at the time of their deaths in 1901 and 1906 respectively. Other residents of the square at various times have included diplomat and author Shane Leslie and Peter Birkett, who designed boats in which Richard Branson won transatlantic races in 1986 and 1989.

== Heritage ==
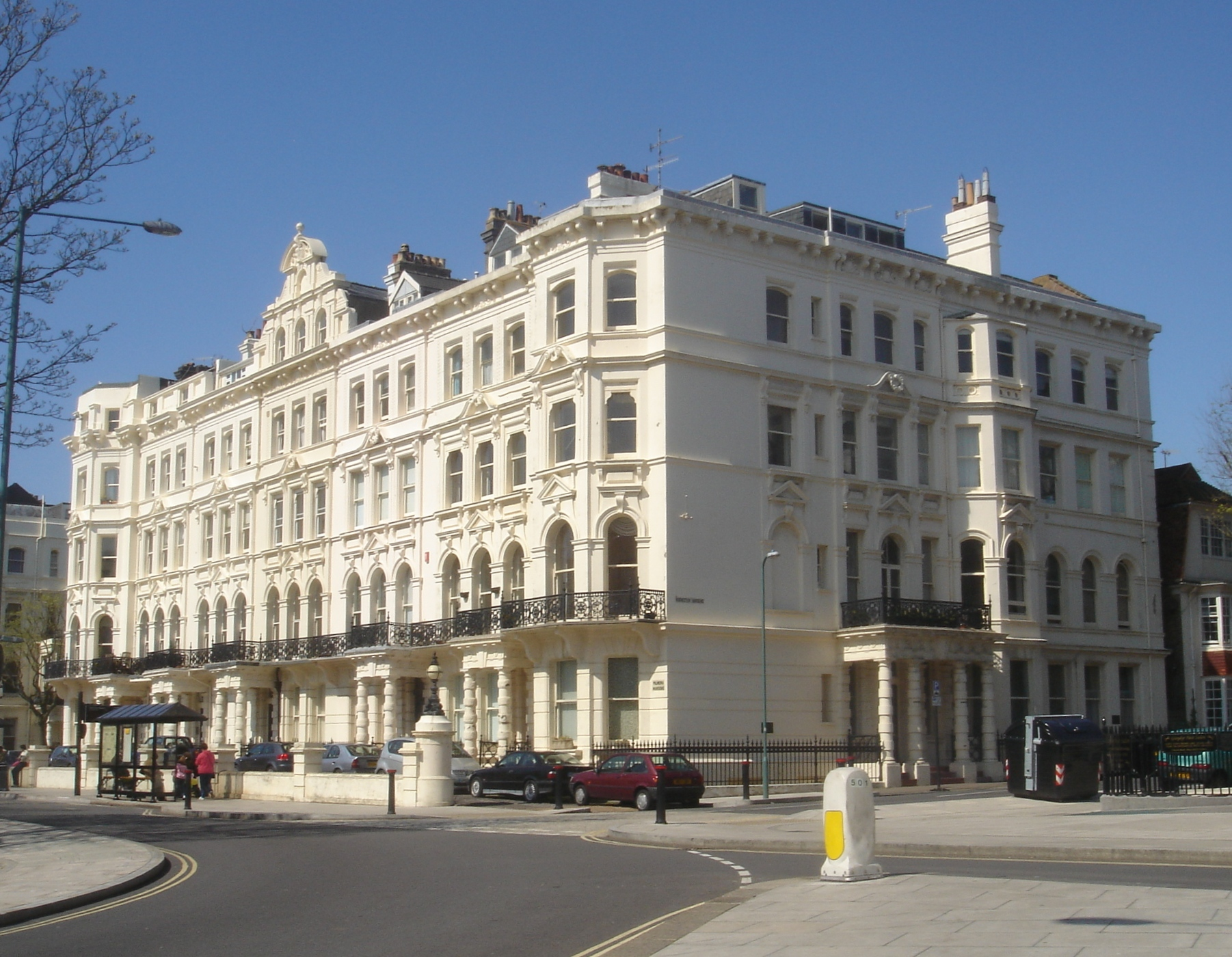
Palmeira Mansions (7–19 pictured) are listed at Grade II.

The east and west sides of Palmeira Square have been listed separately at Grade II by English Heritage, and Palmeira Mansions at the north side of the square has also been listed at this grade under two separate listings. Grade II status is awarded to "nationally important" buildings of "special interest". As of February 2001 there were 1,124 such buildings in the city. The east side (numbers 1–17) and west side (numbers 18–30) were listed on 10 September 1971. Numbers 7–19 Church Road (Rochester Mansions, Palmeira Mansions and Palmeira Avenue Mansions) and 21–31 Church Road (the other sections of Palmeira Avenue Mansions and Palmeira Mansions) were listed on 4 February 1981. Number 33 Palmeira Mansions was listed at the higher Grade II* on 18 July 1978; such buildings are defined as "particularly important [and] of more than special interest". There were 70 Grade II*-listed buildings in the city of Brighton and Hove as of February 2001.

Palmeira Square forms part of the 95.92-acre (38.82 ha) Brunswick Town Conservation Area, one of 34 conservation areas in the city of Brighton and Hove. This area was designated by the council in 1969. Brighton & Hove City Council's report on the area's character states that Palmeira Square contributes to "one of the finest examples of Regency and early Victorian planning and architecture in the country".

== Architecture ==
=== The square ===
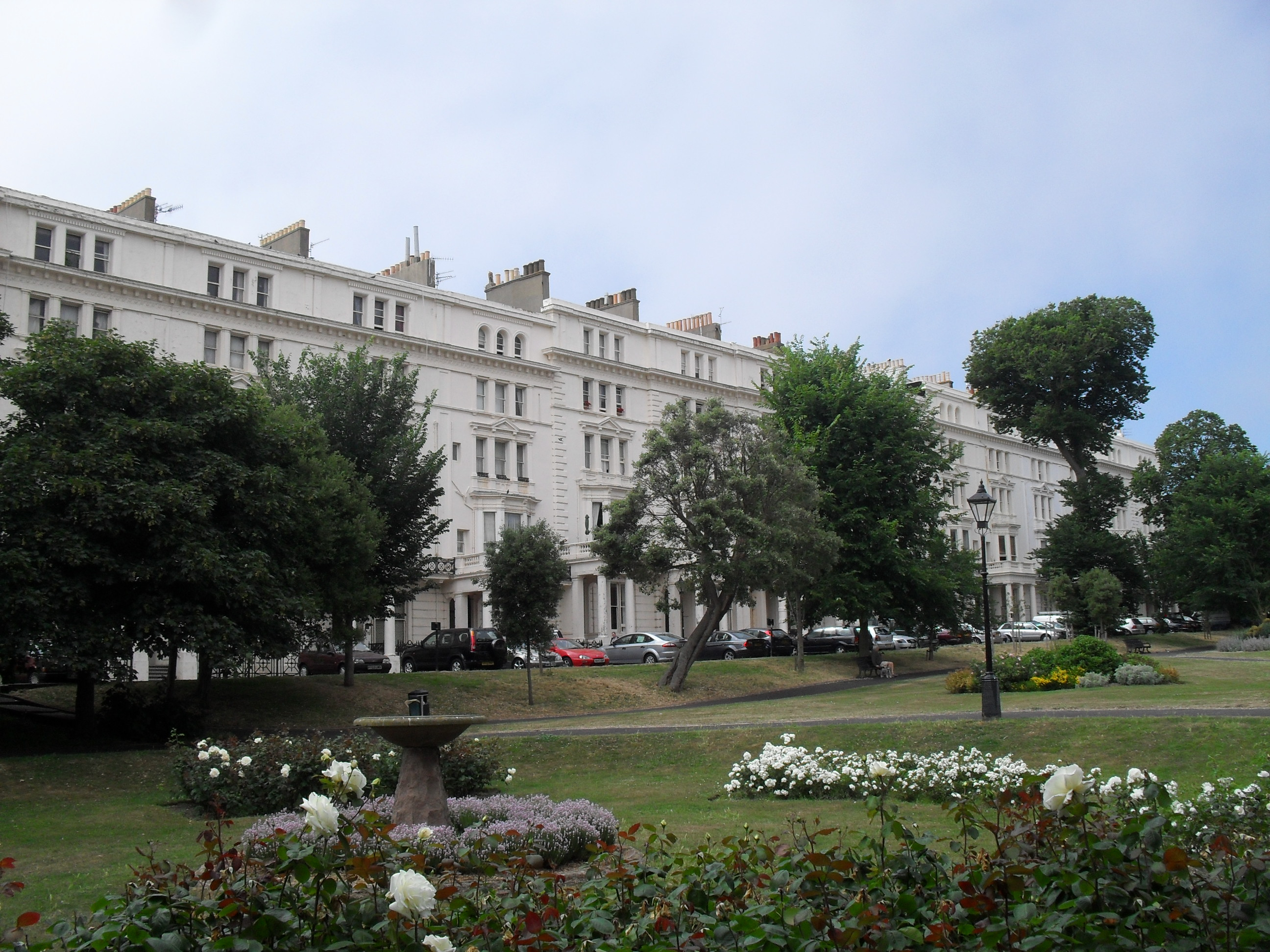
The houses of Palmeira Square have stuccoed façades and rise to five storeys.

Architecturally, Palmeira Square is "quite different from Adelaide Crescent or Brunswick Square ... when Victorian architecture was out of fashion, [it was] condemned as being heavily Italianate". Having been "one of the most notorious examples" of the tendency in Brighton and Hove for residential developments to take much longer than planned, it developed as a natural evolution of the style of neighbouring Adelaide Crescent. Begun as a Regency-style set-piece, this developed in a Neo-Renaissance direction, before work resumed in the 1850s in a simpler post-Regency style. Palmeira Square was then built in a "more full-blooded" interpretation of this Victorian/Italianate theme. Palmeira Mansions, completed nearly 30 years after work started on the square, were designed in the same style and contribute to the square as a single composition, "continuing its ... grandeur and scale". Palmeira Square's style, marking the transition from Regency into Victorian Italianate, has been likened to the terraces around London's Hyde Park that were built at the same time. Architectural historians Ian Nairn and Nikolaus Pevsner, writing in the 1960s, stated that this gave the square "architectural interest" but "little architectural merit", though. Another author, comparing the houses with those of Adelaide Crescent, wrote of "an undisguised Victorianism of a vigorous and healthy, but nevertheless decidedly inferior, quality".

The 17 houses of the west side (Note: Numbers 31–34 inclusive have not been listed by English Heritage; they were converted into flats called Palmeira Court in 1910.) form a long, straight terrace of five storeys. Under their stucco façades is brick, rubble and bungaroosh—a composite building material commonly found behind stucco in 18th- and 19th-century buildings in Brighton and Hove. Each house has three windows to each storey (either blocked or containing a sash window, and pilasters and quoins between some of the neighbouring buildings mark the terrace out into a symmetrical five-part composition which has been described as either 2–4–5–4–2 or 2–5–3–5–2. The top storey is in the form of an attic, and the treatment of the windows is different: they are on a moulded cornice, and some are arched. On the floor below, the windows are surrounded by Vitruvian scroll patterns, and at the storey below that they are flanked by pilasters which hold up an entablature and small pediment. A cast iron balcony surrounds the first-floor bay windows and is supported by the top of the Doric-columned entrance porch, which has a stuccoed balustrade. According to one writer, "the heavy emphasis of [these] porches give[s] the square an air of respectable solidity"—as do the heavy doors with their recessed panels, moulded ornamentation and decorative fanlights. Original interior fittings include a large "Jacobean-cum-Baroque" chimneypiece in the hall of number 32.

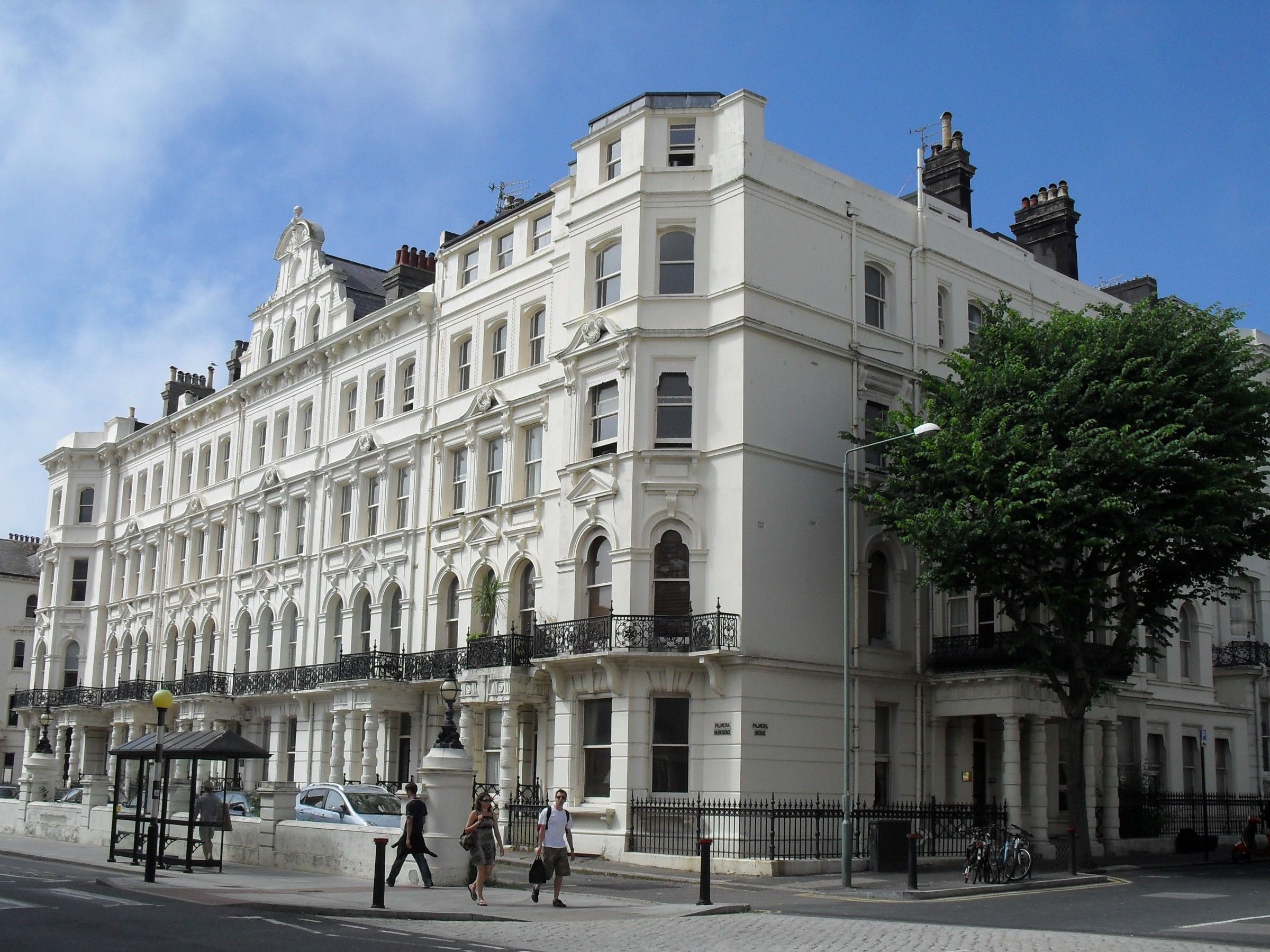
H.J. Lanchester's Palmeira Mansions of 1883–84 (21–31 pictured) are in the same style as the rest of the square.

The terrace on the east side is identical, again having 17 five-storey houses with hipped slate roofs hidden behind parapets, three-window ranges with sash windows and heavy Doric porches. As on the west side, the house in the centre projects slightly from the terrace and has a larger square bay window rising through the first and second floors, forming a loggia which is supported on a colonnaded porch with rustication.

=== Palmeira Mansions ===
H.J. Lanchester's Palmeira Mansions are Italianate in style, like the houses of the square. Some are stuccoed, but others have been painted. The walls are of brick and the roofs have slate tiles. The outermost houses (7, 19 and 21) have entrances set in their side elevations. Each house is five storeys including an attic storey, which has dormer windows added in the 20th century. Each house has a three-window range, and the centremost building is topped by a curved gable. That at numbers 7-19 has a heraldic emblem, possibly that of Sir Isaac Goldsmid, in its tympanum. The outermost buildings have full-height canted bays. Each storey is separated by a string-course across the full width of the building. The first-floor windows are arched and set forward slightly below an entablature and a central pediment. Straight-headed windows on the floor above are embellished with scrollwork, individual pediments and a bracketed entablature. At third-floor level, slightly round-headed windows are set in square recesses. At first-floor level, a cast iron balcony runs across the width of the building; it is supported by the Doric-columned porches in front of each entrance.

Number 33, the other end of the western section of Palmeira Mansions, is listed separately at Grade II* for its "outstanding" and "remarkable collection of fittings from the 1880s" (A.W. Mason bought the house in 1889, although the work may not have been completed until 1899). These include multicoloured marbled floors, staircases, handrails, panelling, columns and dado rails; lincrusta wallpaper; gilded ceilings in a Moorish style; stained glass in various styles; ostentatious chimneypieces, including one by Doulton and others with "riotous swirling motifs"; an overmantel made of Venetian glass; decorative light fittings depicting cherubim and serpents; ceramic tiles by Arts and Crafts designer Walter Crane; and a Rococo-style former ballroom.

=== Surrounding buildings ===
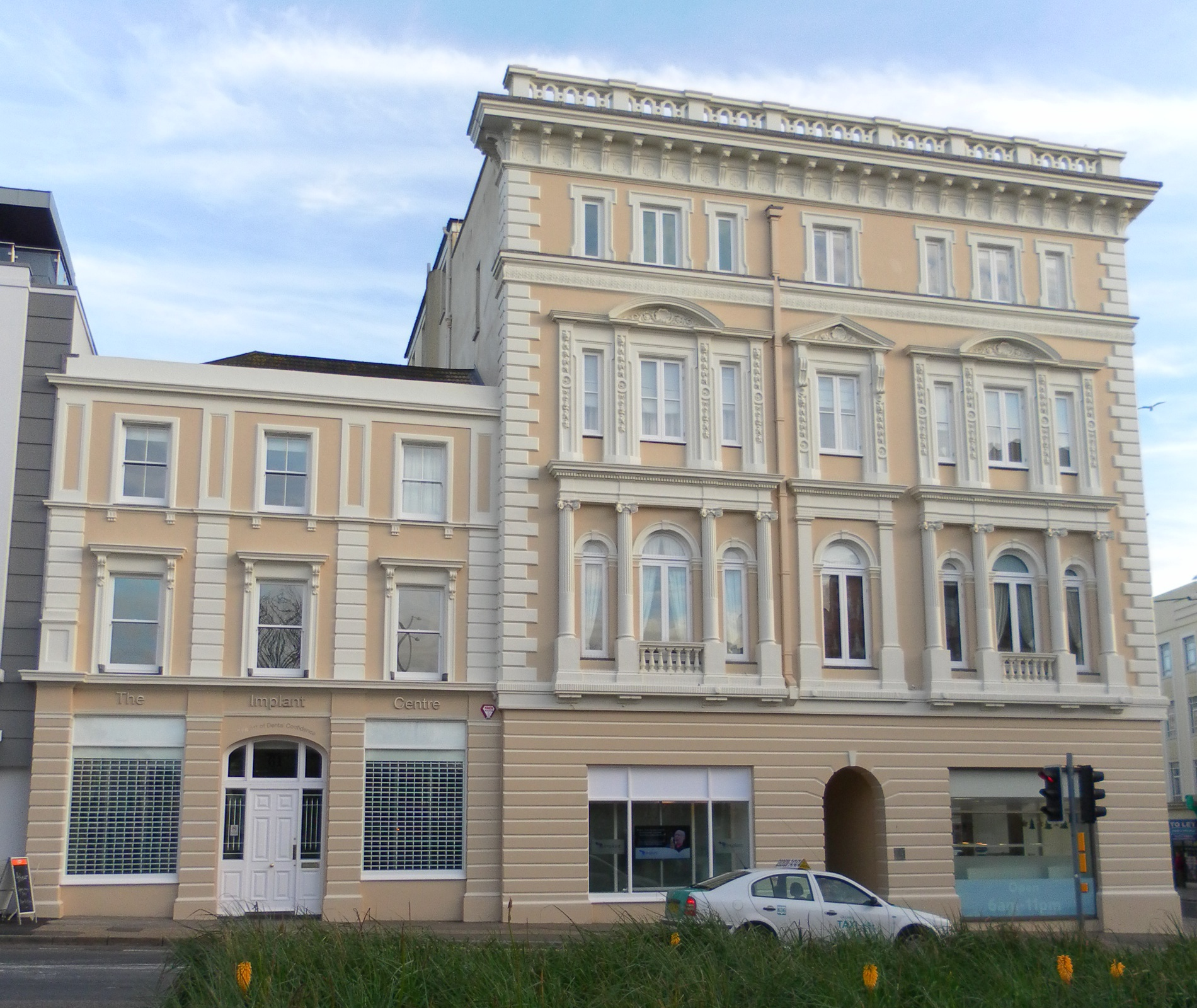
Thomas Lainson designed Palmeira House in 1887.

Gwydyr Mansions is at the northeastern corner of the square, between Rochester Gardens and Holland Road. An opulent set of mansion flats designed by local firm Clayton & Black in 1890, it is in the Flemish Renaissance style and combines ashlar and red brick in its "busy" façade. The entrance has Classical elements, with Tuscan columns in antis beneath a pediment; elsewhere, there elaborate gables, turrets and canted bay and oriel windows.

Palmeira House, designed in 1887 by Thomas Lainson of Lainson & Sons, was that firm's first building for the Brighton & Hove Co-operative Supply Association. It is a "richly Italianate" stucco-clad office building. Opposite, Zephania King's ornate Tudor Revival-style branch building for the London and County Bank (now offices), with tall chimneys and gables, was completed in 1890.

St John the Baptist's Church, the Anglican church serving the area, was built between 1852 and 1854 to the design of William and Edward Habershon. The flint and ashlar building is Decorated Gothic Revival in style and has a later tower (built in the 1870s) topped with a tall stone broach spire. All of the large windows have tracery in the Decorated style. The entrance porch dates from 1906–07. The worship space was cut down in 1990–92 when part of the building was converted by architect Mark Hills into the Cornerstone Community Centre. This required the addition of a tall steel-framed structure and a new glazed opening in the roof.

== See also ==
- Grade II* listed buildings in Brighton and Hove
- Grade II listed buildings in Brighton and Hove: P–R
- List of conservation areas in Brighton and Hove
