= St John the Baptist's Church, Hove =

St John the Baptist, Hove
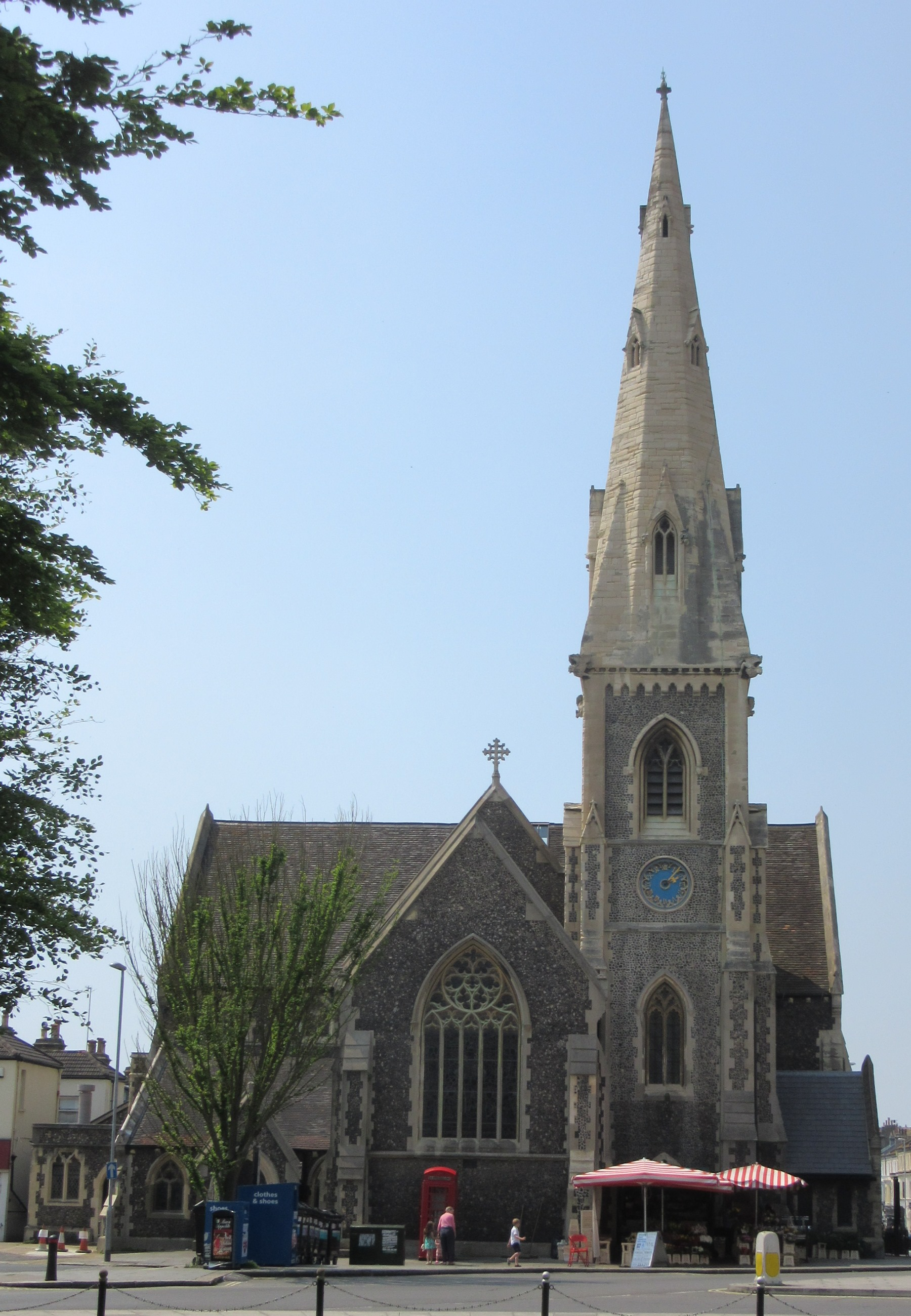
- The church from the east
- St John the Baptist, Hove
- 50.8268°N 0.1648°W
- Location: Palmeira Square/Church Road, Hove, Brighton and Hove
- Country: England
- Denomination: Church of England
- Churchmanship: Central
- Website: www.achurchnearyou.com/st-johns-hove/

History
- Status: Parish church
- Founded: 1852
- Dedication: John the Baptist

Architecture
- Functional status: Active
- Heritage designation: Grade II
- Designated: 12 April 1983
- Architect(s): William and Edward Habershon
- Style: Decorated Gothic Revival
- Groundbreaking: 1852
- Completed: 1854

Administration
- Province: Canterbury
- Diocese: Chichester
- Archdeaconry: Chichester
- Deanery: Rural Deanery of Hove
- Parish: Hove, St John the Baptist

Clergy
- Vicar: Revd Paul Doick

St John the Baptist's Church is an Anglican church in Hove, part of the English city of Brighton and Hove. It was built between 1852 and 1854 to serve the community of the Brunswick area of Hove, which had originally been established in the 1830s.

== History ==
The land on which the Brunswick estate was built was originally a farming estate known as Wick Farm. It was sold to Thomas Read Kemp, who had been responsible for the Kemp Town residential development in neighbouring Brighton, in 1825. Some houses had been built the previous year, and Read Kemp is believed to have planned to create a similar exclusive development on this land; but little happened until after it had been sold to the Jewish baronet Sir Isaac Lyon Goldsmid in 1830. Even then, it took another 20 years for the scheme to be altered and started properly.

Brunswick Town eventually consisted of 150 houses, many of which were exclusive and expensive, but there was no suitable church nearby. Hove's original parish church, St Andrew's, was difficult to reach, while the nearest church on the way to Brighton, also called St Andrew's, was small. Goldsmid therefore provided some land for a church to be built, near what would become the northwest corner of Palmeira Square.

The decision to proceed with construction was taken by the diocese on 21 March 1851, and work started on 15 April 1852 after £4,500 had been raised through borrowings, private donations and a grant. Dr Ashurst Gilbert, the Bishop of Chichester, consecrated the new church on 24 June 1854.

== Architecture ==
The architects William and Edward Habershon, brothers who operated as a partnership, designed the church in the Decorated Gothic style using flint and stone dressings. The cruciform building has a tower at the eastern end; this was added in about 1870, as was the spire, which raises the total height of the building to 160 ft (49 m). The lancet windows have tracery in the Decorated style. A porch was added on the west side in 1906–07 by London-based architectural firm Rogers, Bone & Cole.

== The church today ==
St John the Baptist's Church was listed at Grade II on 12 April 1983. As of February 2001, it was one of 1,124 buildings listed at that grade in Brighton and Hove; the status indicates that the building is considered "nationally important and of special interest".

As well as two Eucharist services on Sundays, there is a weekly Holy Communion service using the official 1662 version of the Book of Common Prayer, a monthly Communion service following the Celtic tradition, a film-based discussion group, children's activities and a Sunday school.

== Gallery ==
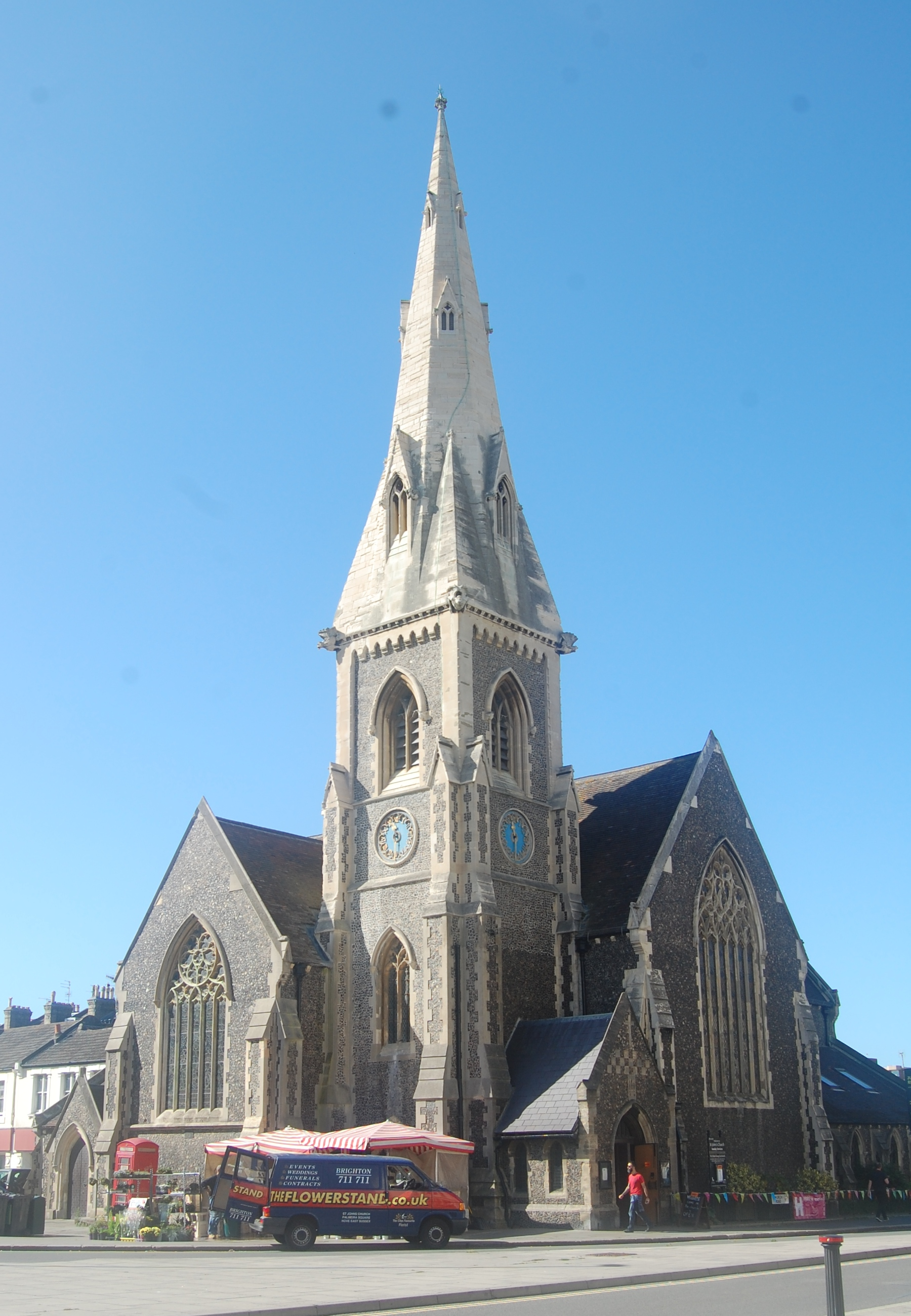
The northeastern corner of the church

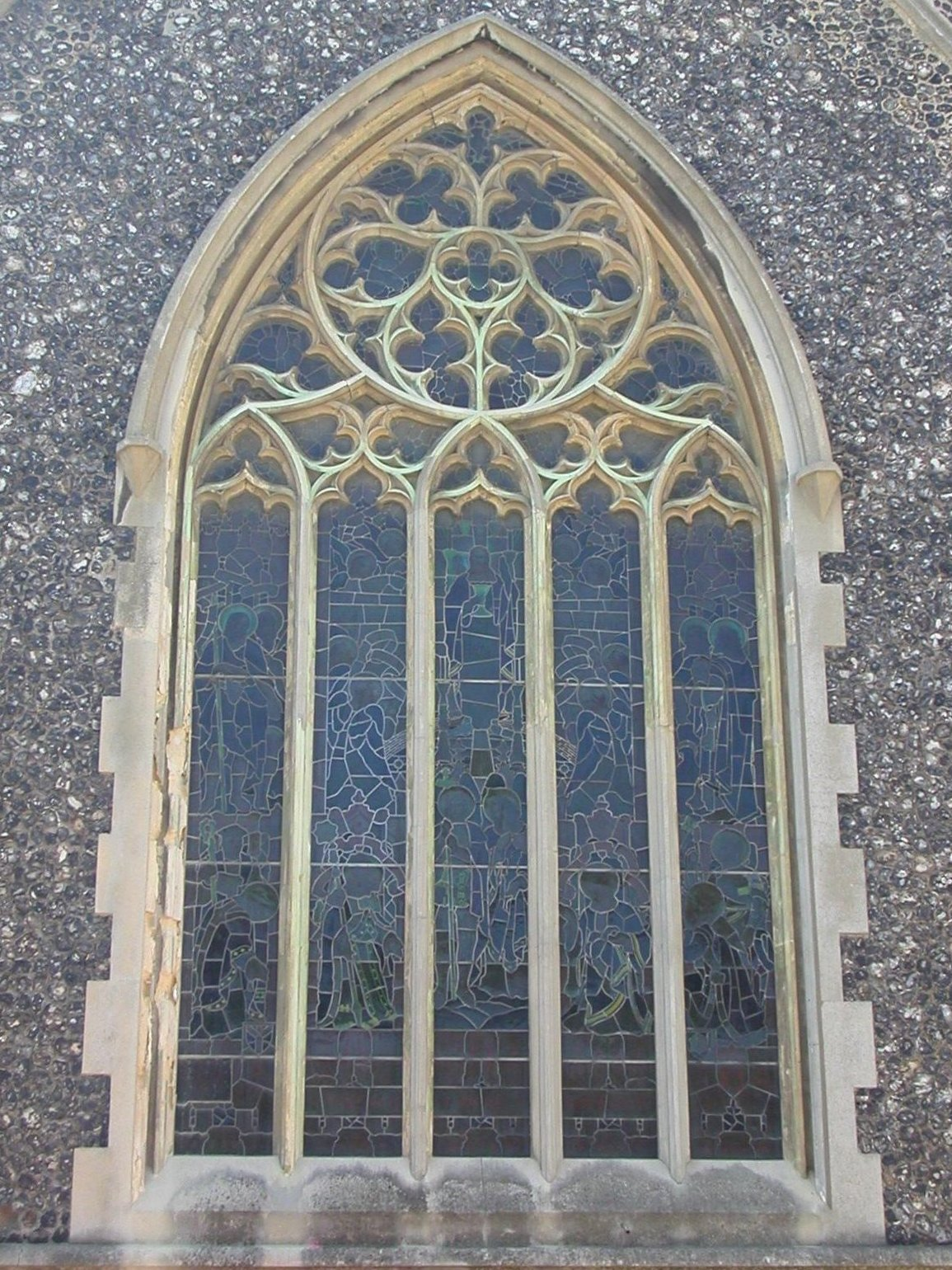
Close view of the eastern end stained glass window

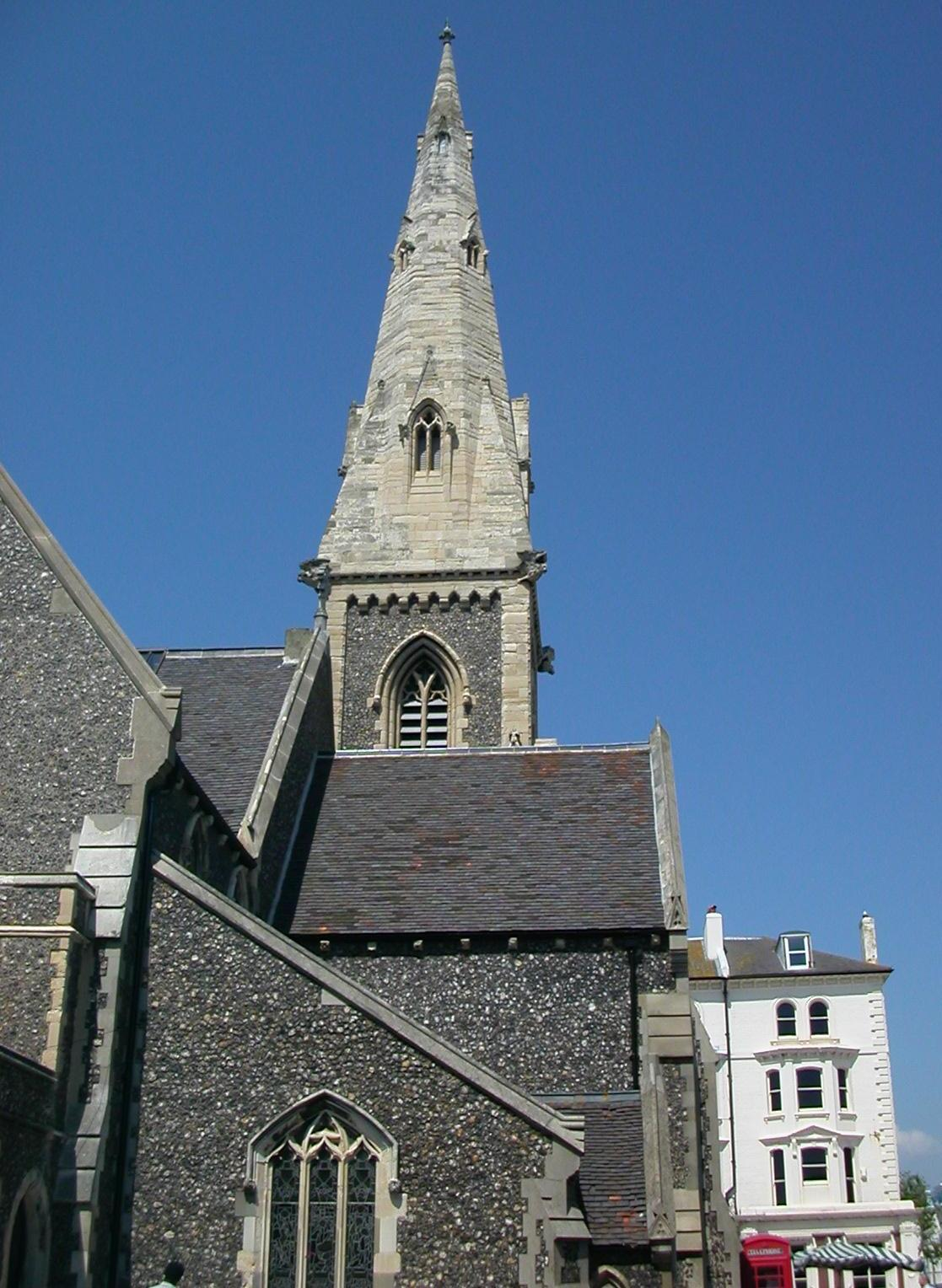
The spire and eastern end, looking to the north

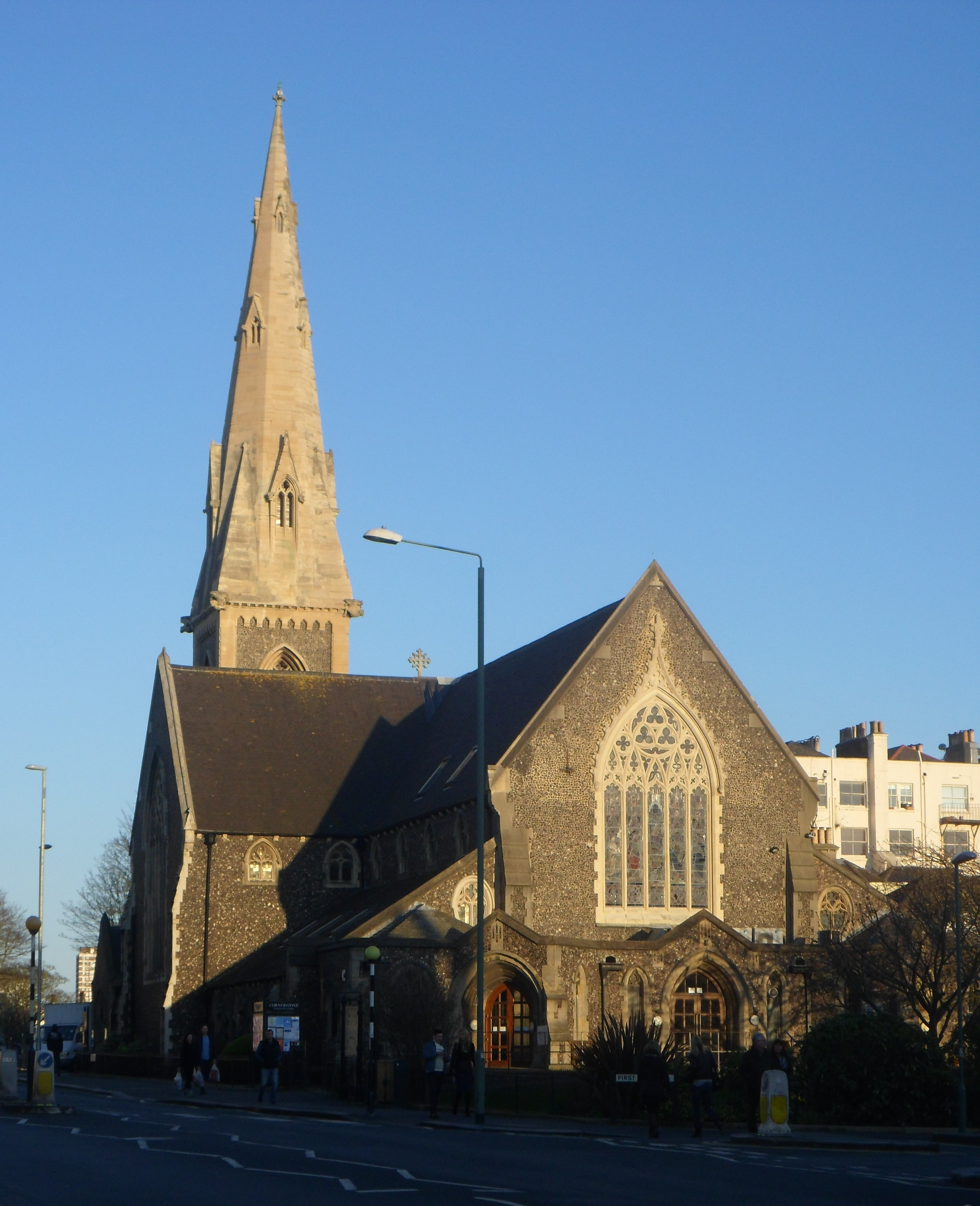
Looking southeastwards from the western end of the church

== See also ==
- Grade II listed buildings in Brighton and Hove: S
- List of places of worship in Brighton and Hove
- Media related to St John the Baptist church, Church Road, Hove, England at Wikimedia Commons
- Steve Ovett

== Bibliography ==
- Antram, Nicholas; Morrice, Richard (2008). Brighton and Hove. Pevsner Architectural Guides. London: Yale University Press. ISBN 978-0-300-12661-7.
- Dale, Antony (1989). Brighton Churches. London: Routledge. ISBN 0-415-00863-8.
