= Studio Theatre (Brighton) =

Theatre in Brighton, England

Coordinates: 50°49′24″N 0°08′20″W

Brighton Dome Studio Theatre
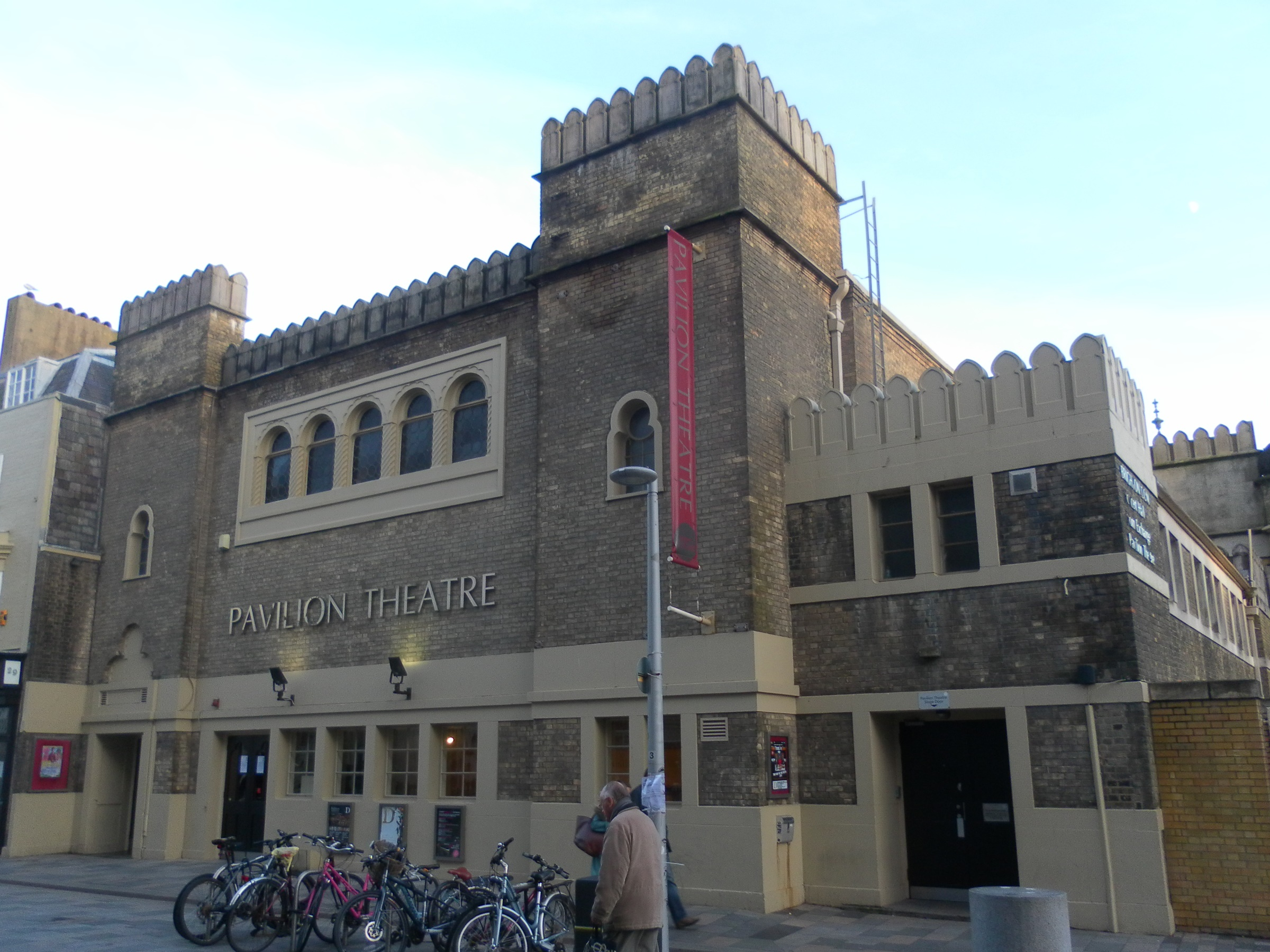
- The theatre in December 2012
- Interactive map of Brighton Dome Studio Theatre
- Address: New Road; Brighton; United Kingdom
- Capacity: 232 seated or 350 standing
- Type: Studio
- Designation: Grade II

Construction
- Opened: 1935
- Years active: 74

The Brighton Dome Studio Theatre (formerly the Pavilion Theatre) is a theatre in Brighton, England. It is part of the wider Brighton Dome complex of buildings. It was built in 1935, originally as a supper room, but later converted into a theatre. Its audience capacity is 232 seated or 350 standing.

== See also ==
- Grade II listed buildings in Brighton and Hove: P–R
