= Brighton Dome =

Arts venue in Brighton, England

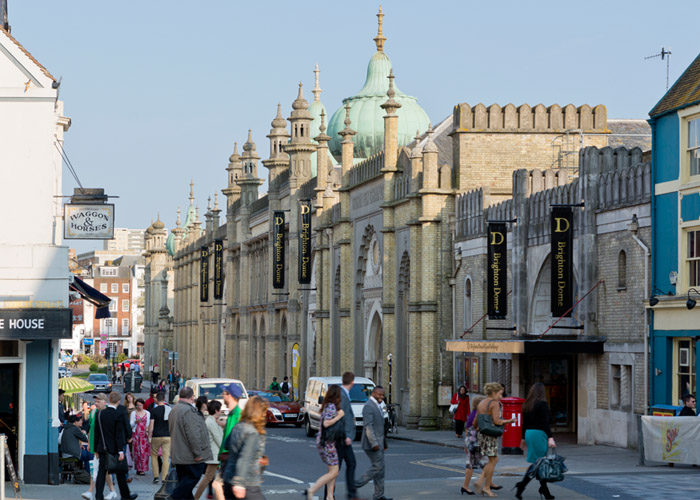
- Church Street facade (2013)
- Interactive map of Brighton Dome
- Location: Brighton, East Sussex, England
- Coordinates: 50°49′24″N 0°08′18″W
- Owner: Brighton & Hove City Council
- Capacity: 1,700 seats (2002–present); 2,100 seats (1935–1999); 2,500 seats (1867–1934)
- Designation: Grade I

Construction
- Opened: 24 June 1867
- Renovated: 1934–1935, 1999–2002
- Expanded: 1935
- Reopened: 18 March 2002
- Architect: Robert Atkinson (1934–1935)

Website
- brightondome.org

Listed Building – Grade I
- Official name: The Corn Exchange and Dome Theatre
- Designated: 13 October 1952
- Reference no.: 1380398

The Brighton Dome is an arts venue in Brighton, England, that contains the Concert Hall, the Corn Exchange and the Studio Theatre (formerly the Pavilion Theatre). All three venues are linked to the rest of the Royal Pavilion Estate by a tunnel to the Royal Pavilion in Pavilion Gardens and through shared corridors to Brighton Museum. The Brighton Dome is a Grade I listed building.

== History ==
=== Design and construction ===
The Stables (now the Concert Hall) and the Riding School (now the Corn Exchange) were commissioned by the Prince Regent to the designs of William Porden in the early 19th century.

==== Concert Hall ====
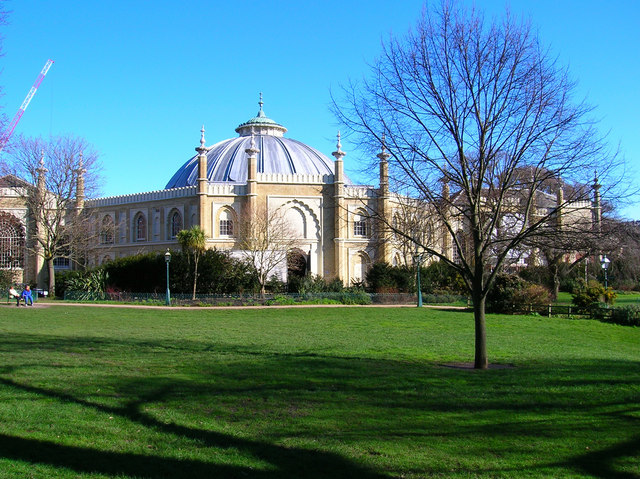
The Concert Hall from Pavilion Gardens

The Concert Hall was commissioned as the Prince Regent's stables and was intended to hold 44 horses in a circular stable arrangement with space for the groomsmen on the balcony level above. The design was based on the Halle au Ble in Paris which had been built in 1782. The central cupola, 80 feet (24 m) in diameter and 65 feet (20 m) in height, later gave the building its name The Dome. In the centre of the room was a large lotus-shaped fountain which was used to water the horses. The stables were occupied by 1806 and the exterior finished in 1808.

In 1850, Queen Victoria, who had inherited the estate, sold the Royal Pavilion Estate to the town for £50,000. A number of different uses were proposed for the Concert Hall site: these included a law court and a swimming baths. The vote to turn the Concert Hall into an assembly rooms was passed by a very small majority. In 1866 plans were approved by the Pavilion Committee and work began to the designs of Philip Lockwood. The designs featured richly coloured paintings, stained glass windows and a large gas powered chandelier formed the centrepiece to the room. Measuring 31.6 feet (9.6 m) in height and 14 feet (4.3 m) in diameter, it had over 520 gas-powered jets. In 1888 the central chandelier was taken down, thought because of the expensive running costs; however customers reported the room was now too dim and so parts of the chandelier were rehung.

Additional work began to improve the entrance hall and the interior of the building was undertaken to the designs of Robert Atkinson in 1934. Concert Hall events included weekly Methodist services on Sunday evenings, which attracted large crowds in the post-war period. In the 1960s and 1970s, these services were led by Rev. Frank Thewlis.

A major refurbishment of the complex was undertaken between 1999 and 2002. The improvements, which cost £22 million, included a state-of-the-art acoustic system in the Concert Hall, new and improved seating, stage lifts and improved foyer facilities. The renovated building was re-opened by the Princess Royal in 2002.

==== Corn Exchange ====
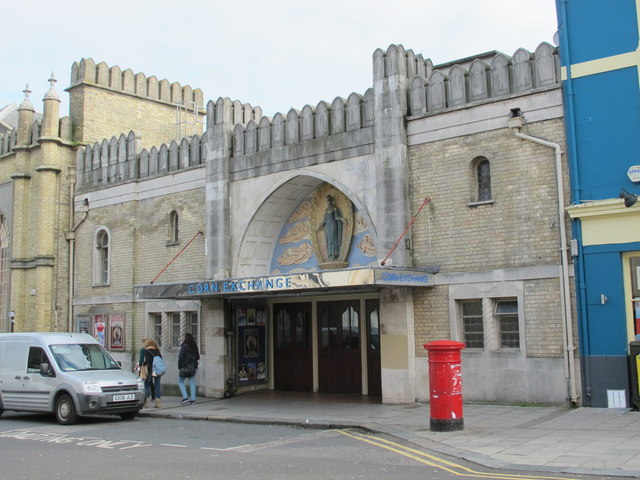
The entrance to the Corn Exchange

The Corn Exchange was commissioned as the Prince Regent's riding school. The riding school measured 174 feet (53 m) long, 58 feet (18 m) wide, and 34 feet (10 m) high. On 1 October 1868 the riding school officially became the town's corn exchange. A large sculpture of the goddess of corn Ceres by the artist James Woodford was installed in the entrance in 1934.

==== The Studio Theatre ====
The Studio Theatre stands on the site of stables which were built for Maria Fitzherbert, a long-term companion of the Prince Regent, in 1808. The stables were later demolished and, Supper Rooms were built on the site to the designs of Robert Atkinson and completed in 1935. It was converted into a theatre shortly afterwards.

=== Later history ===
During the First World War the Dome, as well as the Pavilion, was used to house injured Indian soldiers. It was thought that they would feel more at home in the Indian surroundings. Between 1 December 1914 and 15 February 1916 over 4,000 wounded Indian soldiers were nursed back to health at the makeshift hospitals set up inside the buildings of the Royal Pavilion estate. Three operating theatres were installed, one inside Brighton Dome itself.

The complex became a popular venue for concerts: the band, The Who, performed there in April 1967, and, the suite that would become The Dark Side of the Moon was premièred at the Dome by Pink Floyd on 20 January 1972.

Brighton Dome staged the Eurovision Song Contest on 6 April 1974, when ABBA won for Sweden with the song "Waterloo". The UK's national selection show Eurovision: You Decide was held in the venue on 7 February 2018, hosted by Mel Giedroyc and Måns Zelmerlöw.

== The Dome Organ ==
One of the Dome's most famous features is its pipe organ. The first pipe organ in the Dome's Concert Hall was built in 1870 by the famous London firm of Henry Willis & Sons to a specification of forty-four stops spread over four manuals and pedals. This instrument was removed in 1935 for the great rebuilding of the theatre and was never returned, but broken up for parts. The present instrument, which replaced it in 1935, was built by the firm of Hill, Norman and Beard. This organ has four manuals and 178 stops obtained by extension and borrowing of numerous ranks, plus numerous percussion effects.

== See also ==
- Corn exchanges in England

Preceded by Grand Théâtre; Luxembourg City	Eurovision Song Contest; Venue; 1974	Succeeded by Stockholmsmässan; Stockholm
