= Phoenix Street drill hall, Lancaster =

Former military installation in Lancaster, England

Phoenix Street drill hall
- Lancaster
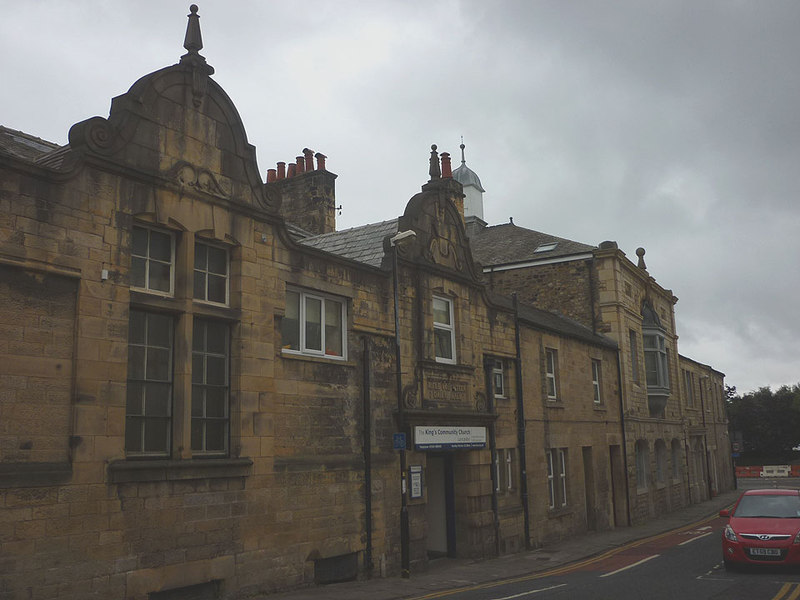
- Phoenix Street drill hall, Lancaster

Site information
- Type: Drill hall

Location
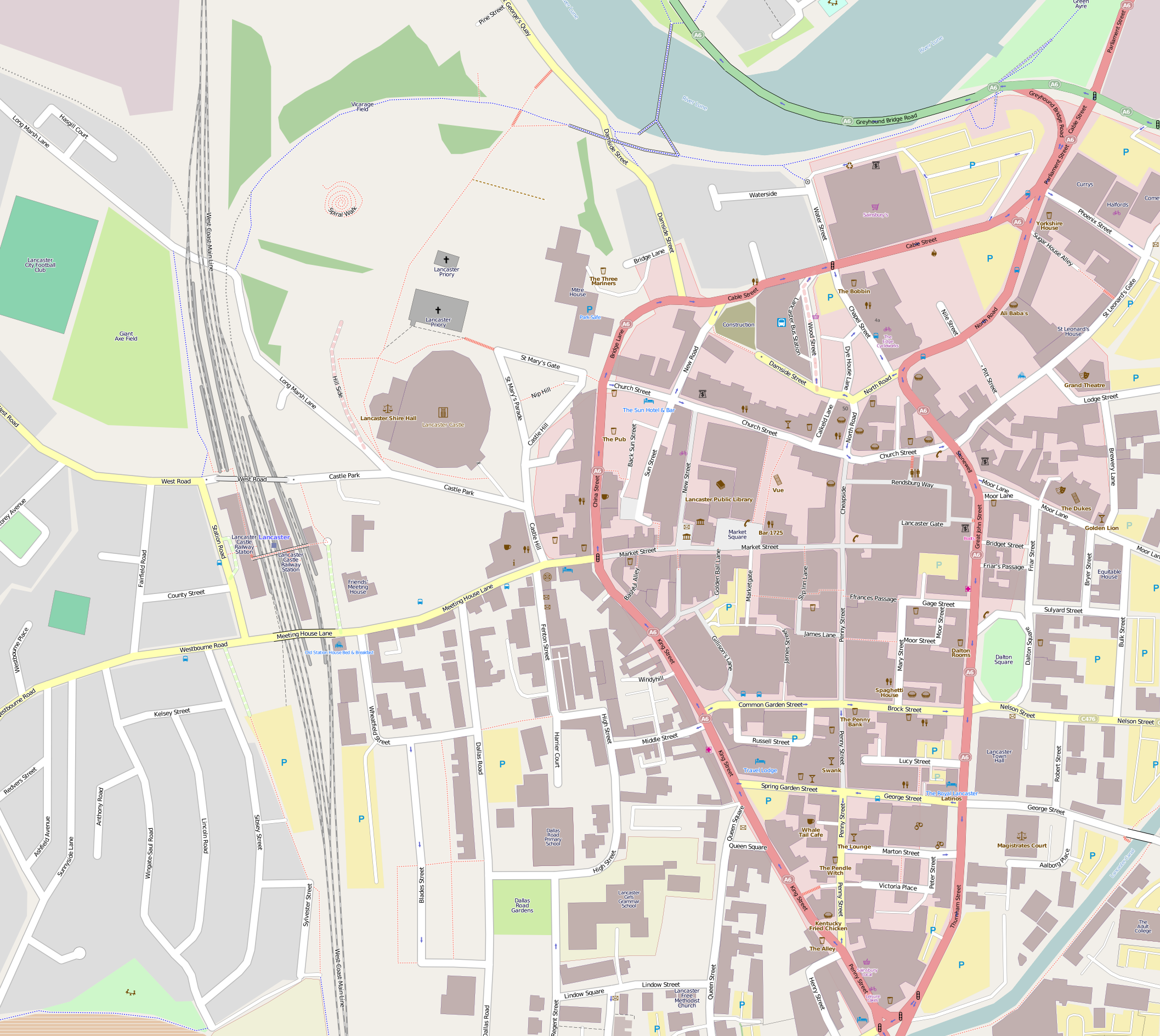
- Location within Lancaster Location within Lancashire
- Coordinates: 54.05127°N 2.79643°W

Site history
- Built: 1894
- Built for: War Office
- In use: 1894-1990

The Phoenix Street drill hall is a former military installation in Lancaster, Lancashire.

== History ==
The building was designed as the headquarters of the Lancaster Rifle Volunteers and completed in 1894. The building was partially converted into barracks in early 1900 for fifty volunteers who were going to South Africa to fight in the Second Boer War as part of the 2nd Battalion of the Royal Lancaster Regiment. The volunteers were drawn from Barrow-in-Furness, Lancaster and Ulverston.

This unit evolved into the 5th Battalion the King's Own Royal Regiment (Lancaster) in 1908. The battalion was mobilised at the drill hall in August 1914 before being deployed to the Western Front. The battalion was redesignated the 4th/5th (Territorial) Battalion The King's Own Royal Regiment (Lancaster) at the drill hall in 1961. The battalion was reduced to a cadre in 1969 but reconstituted as the 4th (Territorial Army) Battalion of the King's Own Royal Border Regiment in 1975.

After the battalion moved to Alexandra Barracks at Caton Road in Lancaster in 1990, the drill hall was decommissioned and is now used as a church.
