= Carlton Place drill hall =

Military installation in Southampton, UK

- Southampton
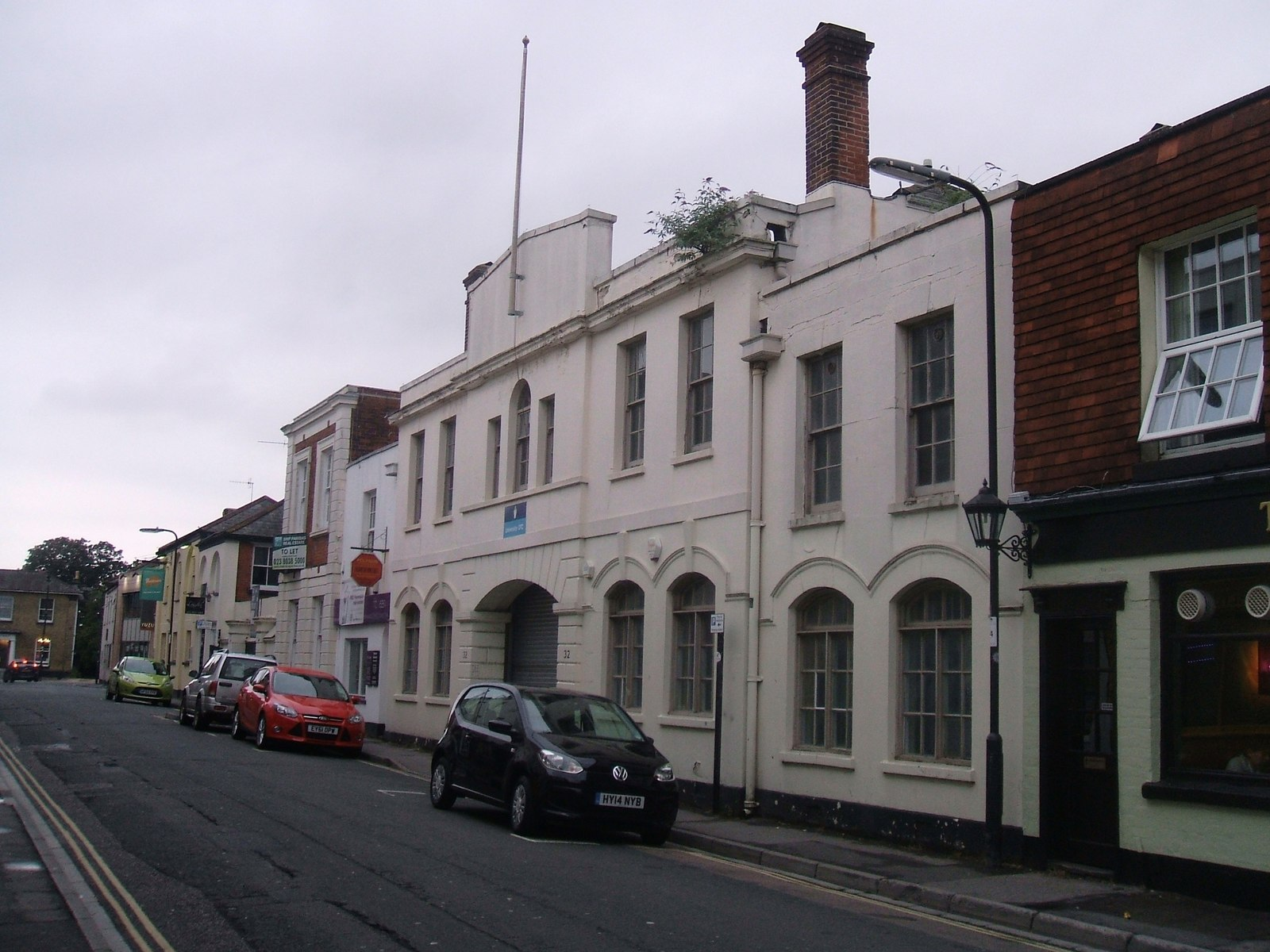
- Carlton Place drill hall

Site information
- Type: Drill hall

Location
- Location in Southampton
- Coordinates: 50°54′47″N 1°24′19″W

Site history
- Built: Early 19th century
- Built for: War Office
- In use: Early 19th century–Present

The Carlton Place drill hall is a military installation in Southampton, Hampshire.

== History ==
The building is a former Regency era house, built in the late 1820s, to which a substantial new riding school, designed by William Hinves, was added in the late 1840s. The complex was converted into assembly rooms in the 1860s before becoming the headquarters of the 2nd Hampshire Rifle Volunteer Corps. This unit evolved to become the 2nd Volunteer Battalion, the Hampshire Regiment in 1885 and the 5th Battalion of the Hampshire Regiment in 1908. The battalion was mobilised at the drill hall in August 1914 before being deployed to India. The battalion amalgamated with the 7th Battalion to form the 5th/7th Battalion at Southampton in 1921 but the two battalions separated again in 1939 for the duration of the Second World War.

The battalion converted to form the 14th Battalion, The Parachute Regiment in 1948. It amalgamated with the 4th Battalion to form the 4th/5th Battalion in 1956 but, following defence cutbacks, the amalgamated battalion was disbanded in 1967. Southampton Universities Officers' Training Corps moved to the drill hall in 1981.

== Current units ==
- Southampton University Officers' Training Corps
