= Church Street drill hall, Brighton =

Former military installation in Brighton, UK

Church Street drill hall
- Brighton
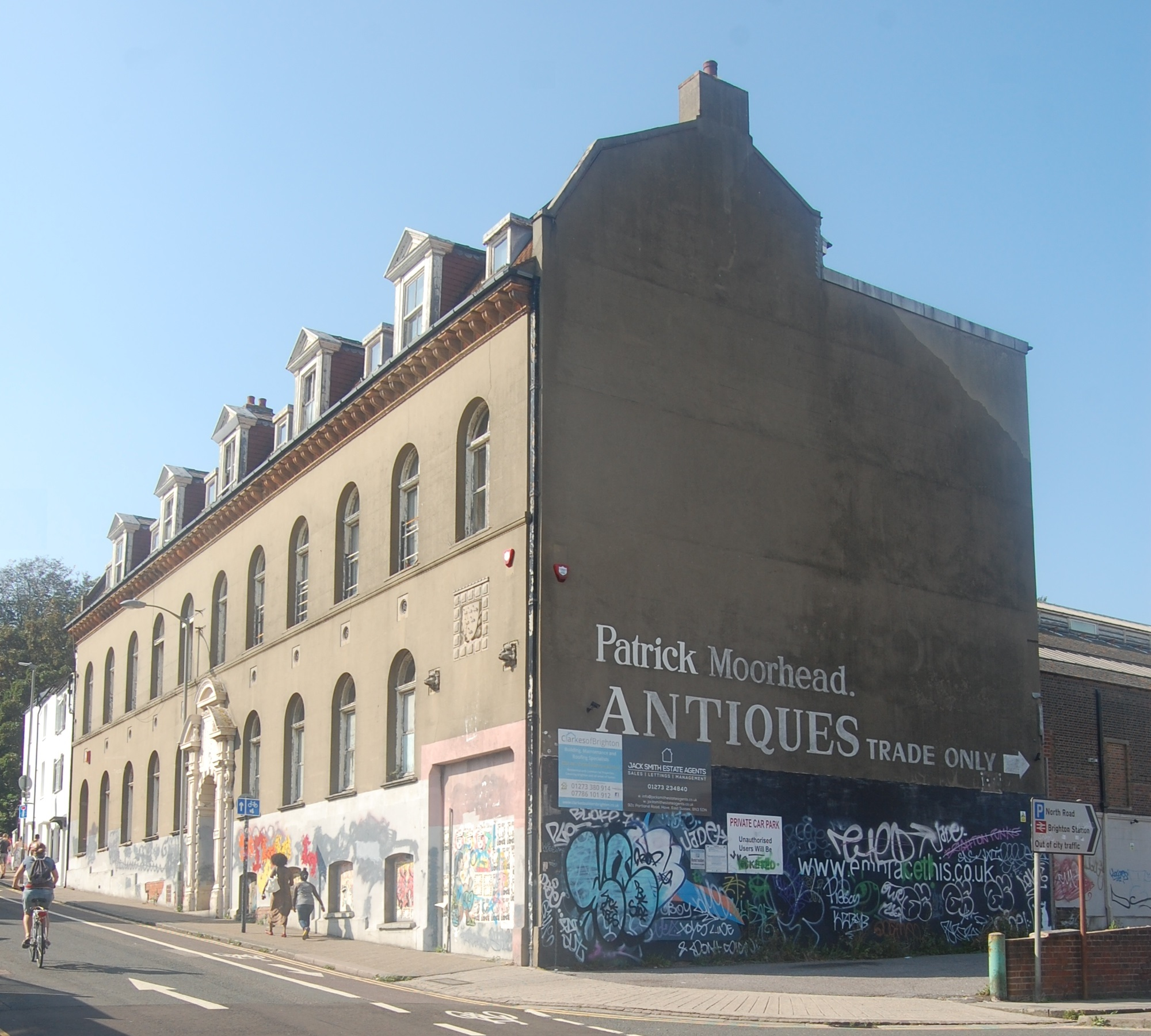
- Church Street drill hall

Site information
- Type: Drill hall

Location
- Location within Sussex
- Coordinates: 50.82492°N 0.14194°W

Site history
- Built: 1890
- Built for: War Office
- In use: 1890-1967

The Church Street drill hall is a former military installation in Brighton. It is a Grade II listed building.

== History ==
The building was designed by Edmund Scott to serve as the headquarters for the 1st Volunteer Battalion of The Royal Sussex Regiment, and was completed in 1890. This unit evolved to become the 6th (Cyclist) Battalion, The Royal Sussex Regiment, but moved to Montpelier Place in Brighton before the First World War.

Meanwhile, the Sussex Imperial Yeomanry had been located at the Church Street drill hall since its reformation in 1901. The regiment was mobilised at the drill hall in August 1914 before being deployed to Gallipoli and, ultimately, to the Western Front. After the First World War, the unit converted to an artillery role and was reduced to battery size, becoming the 389 (Sussex Yeomanry) Battery, the 98th (Sussex Yeomanry) Brigade, Royal Field Artillery.

After the Second World War, the battery was reformed as P Battery, 344th (Sussex Yeomanry) Light Anti-Aircraft and Searchlight Regiment, Royal Artillery, and later as P Battery, 258th (Sussex Yeomanry) Light Anti-Aircraft Regiment, Royal Artillery in 1955. After the defence cut-backs of 1967, the drill hall was decommissioned and converted into a Royal Mail sorting office. It was designed as a grade II listed building in April 1995. More recently, it has been used as an antiques warehouse.

== See also ==
- Grade II listed buildings in Brighton and Hove: P–R
