= Adelaide Mansions =

Historic site in East Sussex, England

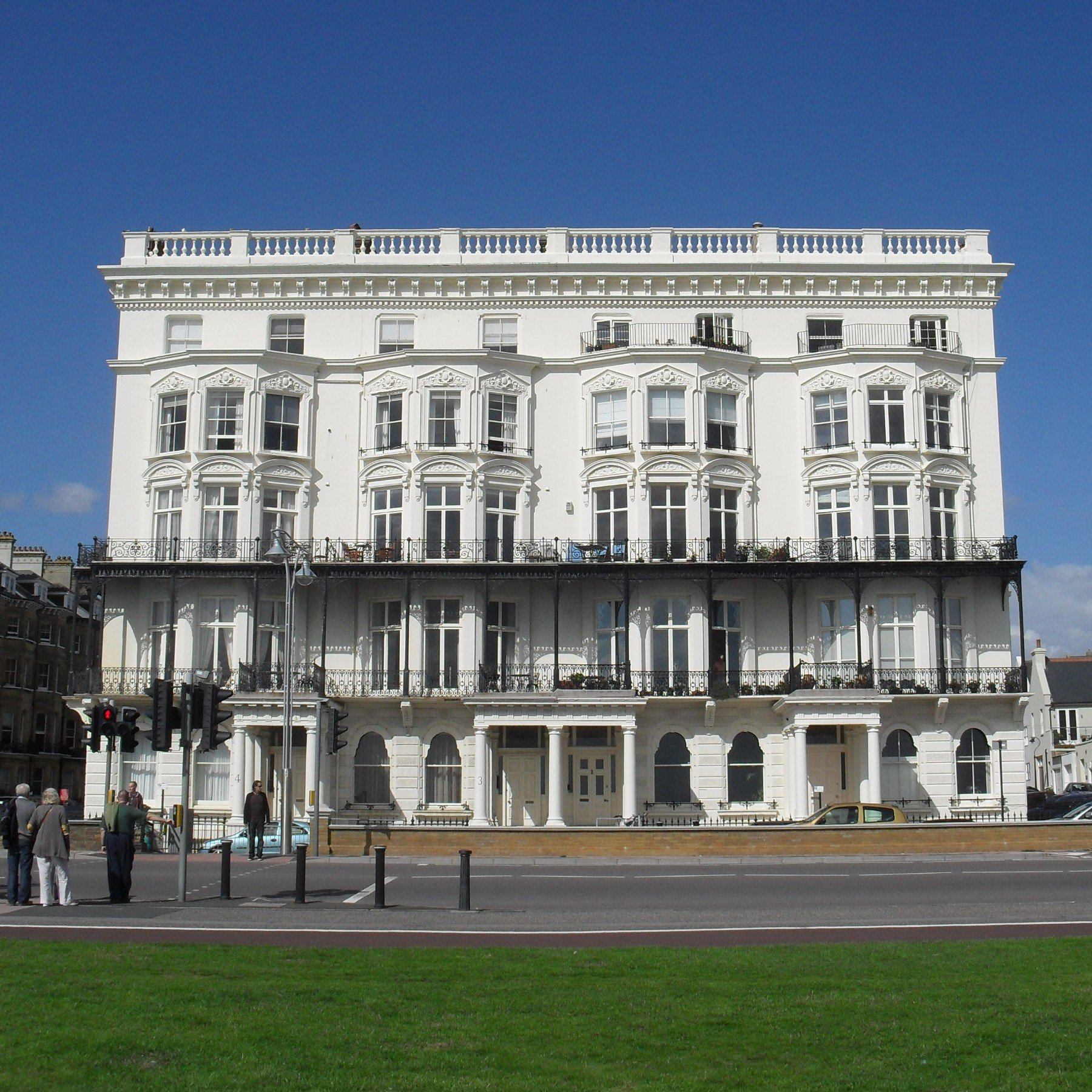
- The building from the south

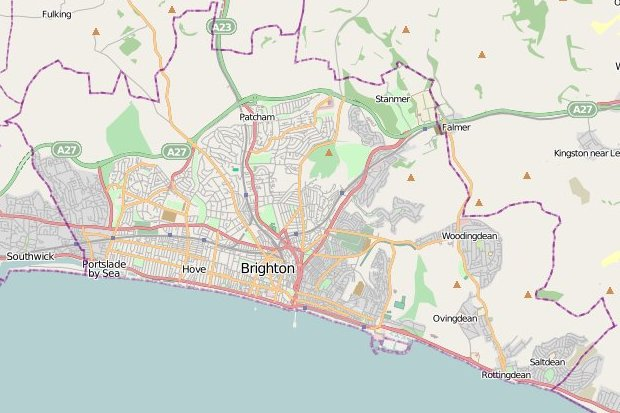
- Location within Brighton and Hove
- 50.8244°N 0.1658°W
- Location: 1–4 Kingsway, Hove, Brighton and Hove BN3 2FD, United Kingdom

History
- Built: 1873

Site notes
- Architect: Thomas Lainson
- Architectural style: Classical/Italianate

Listed Building – Grade II
- Official name: Adelaide Mansions, 1–4 Kingsway
- Designated: 2 November 1992
- Reference no.: 1205849

Adelaide Mansions is a residential building on the seafront in Hove, part of the city of Brighton and Hove in East Sussex, England. The "handsome block", decorated with ornate details, was erected in 1873 to the design of local architect Thomas Lainson. English Heritage has listed the building at Grade II for its architectural and historical importance.

== Location ==
Adelaide Mansions is located at the junction of St John's Road and Kingsway in Hove. Kingsway is the seafront road in this part of Hove; renamed several times, it took its present name in February 1910 to commemorate King Edward VII (1841–1910). St John's Road leads northwards from the seafront to Palmeira Square and St John the Baptist's Church, from which it took its name in 1907 (previously it was called Palmeira Mews Road). Adelaide Crescent, an architectural set-piece dating from the mid-19th century, lies to the east; both the crescent and the mansions were named after Adelaide of Saxe-Meiningen (1792–1849); landowner and developer Isaac Lyon Goldsmid (1778–1859) asked King William IV (1765–1837) for permission to use his queen's name.

== History ==
Prolific Brighton-based architect Thomas Lainson (1825–1898) designed the block in 1873 on land that was part of the Wick estate—a large area of agricultural land between the growing town of Brighton and the village of Hove. This land was owned by Isaac Lyon Goldsmid by the 1830s, and he set about developing it with high-class housing. His Adelaide Crescent scheme, intended to be a rival to Brighton's Kemp Town development, was built between the 1830s and 1860s. Financial problems and the spectacular destruction of the crescent's principal feature, the Anthaeum indoor garden and conservatory, delayed the scheme's progress. By 1873, there was still open land to the west fronting Kingsway, and it was on this site adjoining the southwest corner of the crescent that the mansions were built. The builder was Jabez Reynolds senior who built about 1,000 houses in Brighton and Hove including other landmark and listed buildings such as Palmeira Mansions, Medina Terrace, and the workhouse on Elm Grove, now Brighton General Hospital.

Until 1918, the building was in residential use. In that year numbers 3 and 4 were turned into the Lawns Hotel, a luxury hotel "noted for its quiet comfort and excellent cuisine". Rates were four guineas per week at first. By the 1970s its character had changed from a conventional hotel to more of a long-stay residence: there were 47 bedrooms, over half of which were occupied by (mostly elderly) residents. Its fortunes declined in the 1980s: the building suffered £100,000 of damage in the Great Storm of 1987, and months later a faulty heating system caused fumes to escape and led to the closure of part of the hotel. In 1990 the Zipadeedoodah Bar and First Avenue Restaurant were established on the ground floor, but by 2001 all had closed down and numbers 3 and 4 were converted back into flats.

Adelaide Mansions was listed at Grade II by English Heritage on 2 November 1992. This status is awarded to "nationally important" buildings of "special interest". As of February 2001, it was one of 1,124 Grade II-listed buildings and structures, and 1,218 listed buildings of all grades, in the city of Brighton and Hove.

== Notable residents ==
- Woolf Barnato (1895–1948), financier and racing driver.
- Vere Benett-Stanford, Conservative Member of Parliament for Shaftesbury from 1873 to 1880.
- Hilton Philipson (1892–1941), National Liberal Party Member of Parliament for Berwick-upon-Tweed in 1922, lived at 1 Adelaide Mansions in 1903.

== Architecture ==
It has a terrace of four-storey, three-bay houses with Classical touches such as Doric-columned porches. There are ground-floor sash windows and iron balconies, and a parapet with a balustrade runs along the top of the building.

== See also ==
- Grade II listed buildings in Brighton and Hove: A–B
- Media related to Adelaide Mansions at Wikimedia Commons
