= The Cornfield =

Painting by John Constable

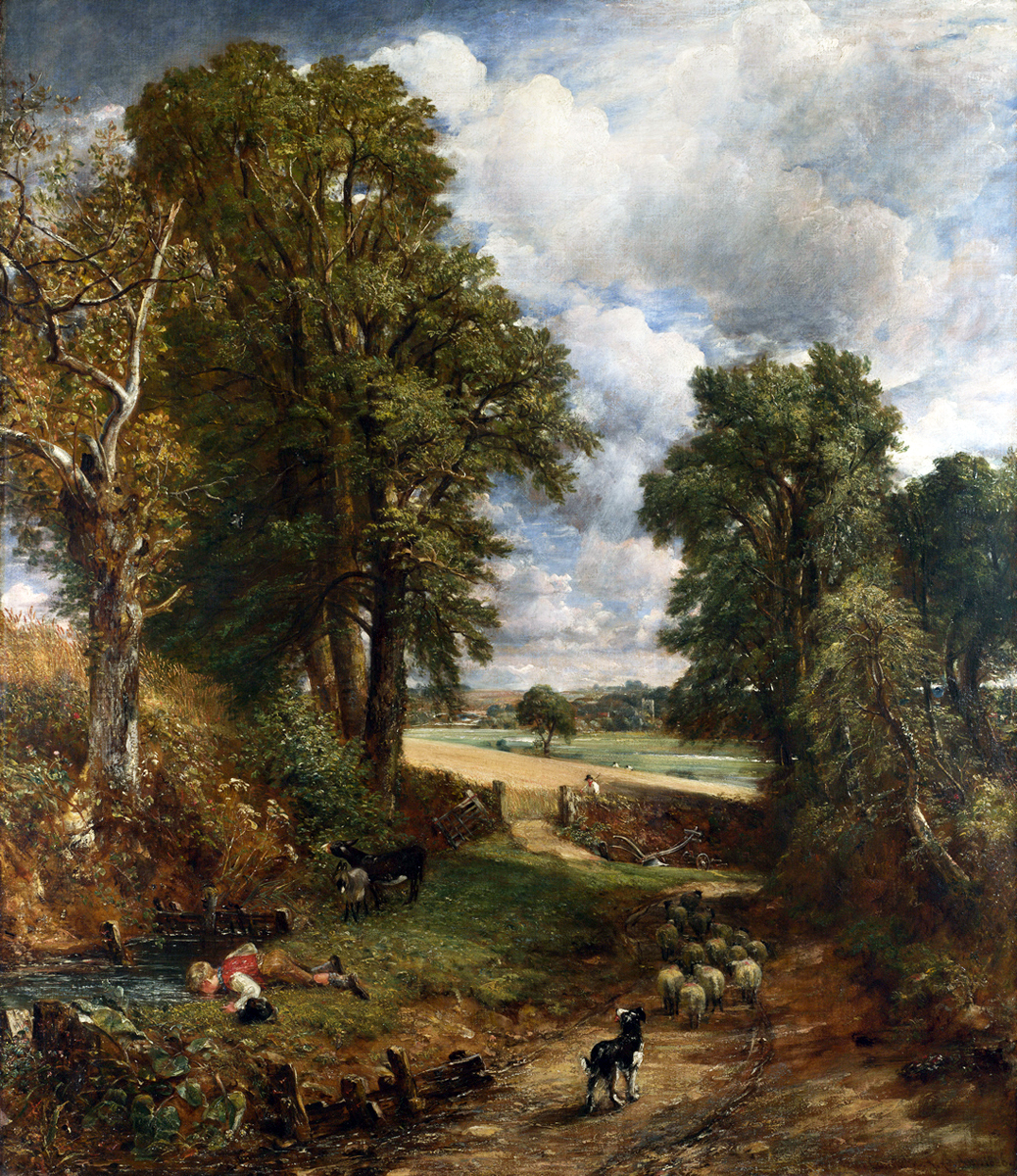
- Artist: John Constable
- Year: 1826
- Medium: Oil on canvas
- Dimensions: 143 cm × 122 cm (56 in × 48 in)
- Location: National Gallery, London

The Cornfield is an oil painting by the English artist John Constable, completed from January to March 1826 in the artist’s studio. The painting shows a lane leading from East Bergholt toward Dedham, Essex, and depicts a young shepherd boy drinking from a pool in the heat of summer. The location is along Fen Lane, which the artist knew well. Constable referred to the piece as The Drinking Boy.

On the advice of Constable's friend, the botanist Henry Phillips, The Cornfield was painted with the trees and plants depicted as accurately as possible. Constable commissioned the engraver David Lucas to produce the plates of the painting for a book, Various Subjects of Landscape, Characteristic of English Scenery, first published in July 1830. The art historian Anthony Bailey considers The Cornfield to have "opened the gate through which a great number of people were to pass into Constable's country". It was exhibited at the Royal Academy of Arts in April 1826, under the title Landscape: Noon, and shown in Paris from early November to the spring of 1828. The painting was praised but Constable did not find a buyer. After the artist’s death, funds were raised to purchase the work for the National Gallery.

== Background ==
John Constable was born in 1776 in the Suffolk village of East Bergholt, to Golding Constable and his wife Ann. His father was a corn merchant, who owned Flatford Mill in the village and a mill in Dedham, Essex; Constable was expected to succeed his father in the business. After his education at schools in Lavenham and Dedham, Constable worked in his father's corn business, but his younger brother Abram eventually took over the running of the mills.

In 1799, the 19-year-old Constable persuaded his father to let him pursue a career in art, and Golding granted him a small allowance to allow him to train. He entered the Royal Academy Schools as a probationer. Following his marriage to Maria Bicknell In 1816, Constable lived in Bloomsbury in central London, before his family settled in Hampstead, where they lived permanently from 1827 onwards. The year The Cornfield was painted, Constable was 50 and had not yet been accepted as a full member of the Royal Academy of Arts, despite having sought election since the early 1820s.

== Composition ==
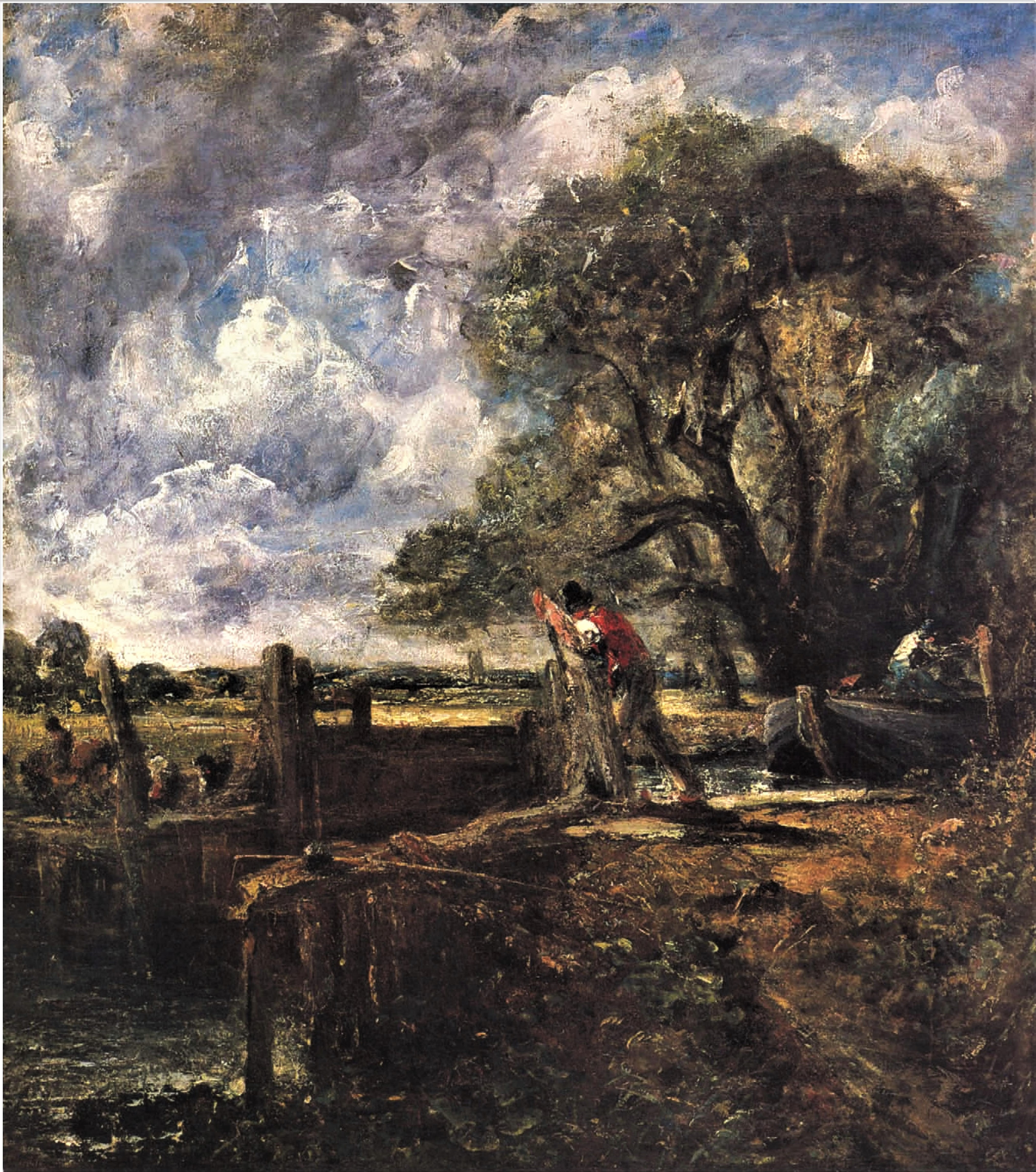
Study for The Cornfield (1826), Birmingham Museum and Art Gallery

Constable's painting The Cornfield, painted in oil on canvas, depicts a young shepherd. The boy, wearing a red waistcoat, is drinking from a pool as he rests from his work at noon in the heat of summer. He has removed his hat. The painting is a view of Fen Lane, which Constable knew well. As a schoolboy he had regularly walked along the lane, which was the shortest way from East Bergholt and over New Fen Bridge across to the River Stour toward his school in Dedham.

The painting was completed from January to March 1826 in Constable's London studio. Constable himself called it The Drinking Boy, (Note: The painting's current title was used from 1838.) and he intended it to be his most important exhibited work of that year. The work is similar in size to The Lock, a painting that was originally planned as a pendant to The Cornfield.

Constable produced a smaller preparatory oil sketch, which has survived, and which shows how the work was developed over time. In the background of the sketch, the figure of the boy and his animals are not depicted. None of the trees in the sketch are dead, unlike the trees painted in the final work. He produced a study for the donkey and her foal, now in the Victoria and Albert Museum in London. No sketches made at the scene are known.

Constable made The Cornfield as botanically accurate as possible. On 1 March 1826, his friend Henry Phillips, a botanist, wrote to Constable with advice about how the plants should be painted. (Note: Constable and Phillips were good friends; they had met in 1824 in the countryside outside Brighton when painting and collecting specimens respectively. A list of flowering plants Constable was sent by his friend, some of which were included in The Cornfield.) Phillips commented: "I think it is July in your green lane. At this season all the tall grasses are in flower, bogrush, bullrush, teasel. The white bindwind now hangs in flowers over the branches of the hedge; the wild carrot and hemlock flower in banks of hedges, cow parsley, water plantain, etc.... bramble is now in flower, poppy, mallow, thistle, hop, etc.." The trees were also carefully depicted. He was preoccupied by his work on the painting, writing to his friend John Fisher, "I could think of and speak to no-one. I was like a friend of mine in the battle of Waterloo—he said he dared not turn his head to the right or left—but always kept it straight forward—thinking of himself alone."

The village of Higham, shown in the distance, is not actually visible from the lane; Constable's son Charles Golding Constable stated after his father's death that the view of Higham church did not exist. The crop in the field is probably meant to be wheat, depicted at full height and as tall as the gate at the end of the lane. To the public seeing Constable's painting during his lifetime, the wheat would have been a representation of peace, fertility and wealth. Constable appears to have borrowed objects from his other paintings and drawings to include in The Cornfield; a tree in the painting bears a strong resemblance to another specimen in his Edge of a Wood (c. 1816), and the boy—with his blue neck scarf, black hat and red waistcoat—is also depicted in Constable's A Lane near Flatford (c. 1810).

According to the art historian Michael Rosenthal, The Cornfield typifies Constable's picturesque phase, which culminated in 1828. After 1822 Constable's was mainly done in his London studio, which led to him being more concerned with the effect of his painting on the senses, and less about realism. The work reflected Constable's nostalgia for the rural Suffolk he recalled from his youth, considered by him to be lost.

=== Engraving by Lucas ===
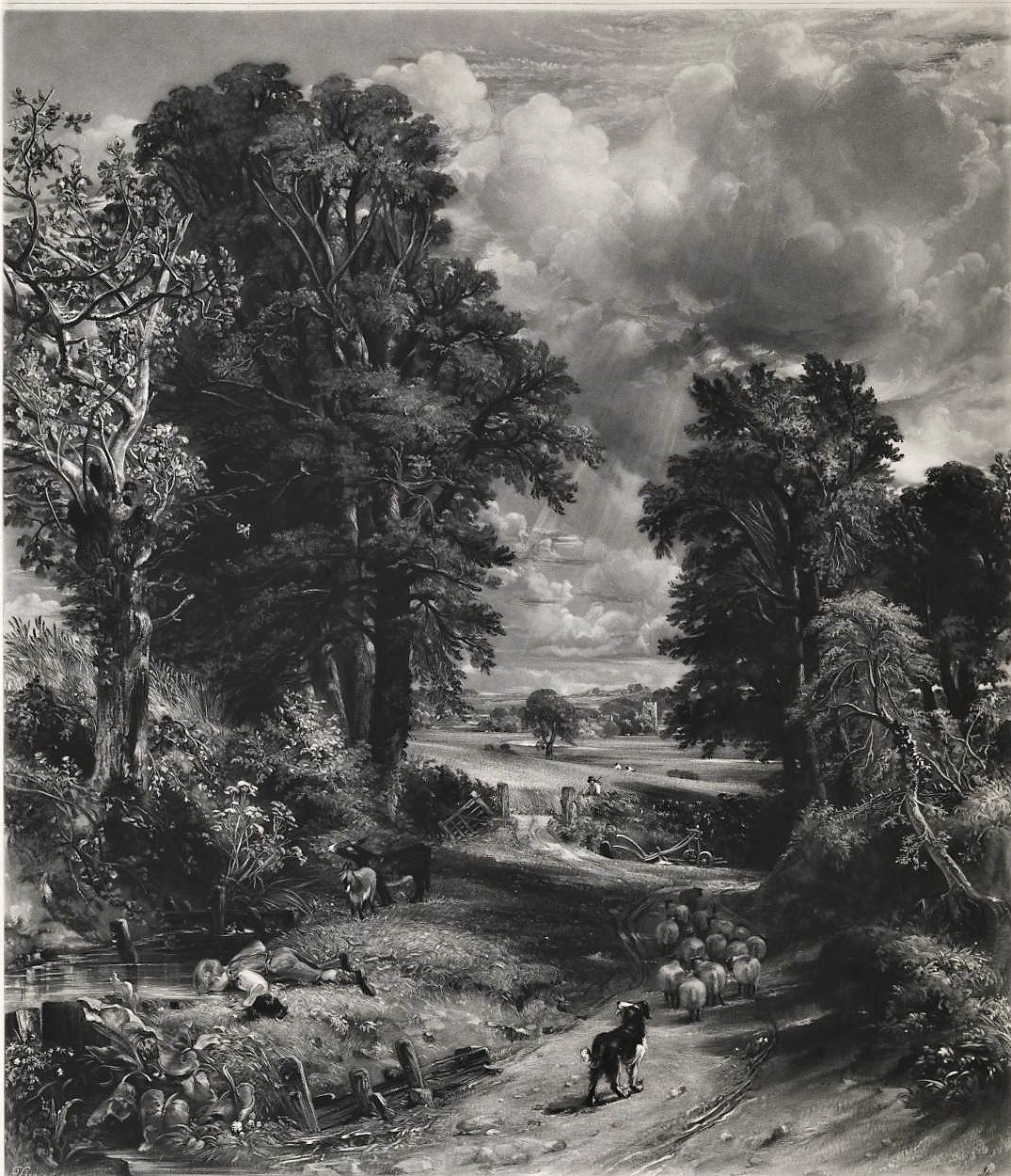
David Lucas's mezzotint print of The Cornfield (published in 1834), Tate Britain

Constable commissioned the engraver David Lucas to produce the plates of the painting for a book, Various Subjects of Landscape, Characteristic of English Scenery. The book was published in July 1830. After seeing prints of The Cornfield and The Lock produced by Lucas, Constable told him, "Now... is every bit of sunshine clouded over in me. I can never look at these two flattering testimonies of the result of my singularly marked life... without the most painful emotions."

in 1834, when suffering from depression and seemingly jealous of the success the prints of The Lock and The Cornfield were attracting, Constable argued with Lucas, and complained his works were no longer giving him pleasure. He told his friend Leslie, "The two beautiful prints by Lucas are in the [shop] windows, but every gleam of sunshine is blighted to me in the art at least. Can it... therefore be wondered at that I paint continual storms?" He later apologised to Lucas.

After Constable's death, James Brook Pulham, a former pupil, borrowed Lucas's prints of The Cornfield and The Lock without permission from the home of the artist. This caused considerable distress to the family. The prints became well-known during the Victorian era, being images that the public had access to, in contrast with the original oil paintings at the National Gallery.

== Exhibitions and reception ==
On 8 April 1826, Constable wrote to his friend Fisher that The Cornfield had been sent to the Royal Academy to be exhibited. (Note: Constable's letter to Fisher mentioned details of his work on The Cornfield: "I have dispatched a large landscape to the Academy, upright, the size of my Lock—but a subject of a very different nature—inland—cornfields—a close lane, kind of thing—but it is not neglected in any part. The trees are more than usually studied and the extremities well defined—as well as their species—they are shaken by a pleasant and healthfull [sic] breeze—at noon....") When on display at the Royal Academy that year, the painting was shown under the title Landscape: Noon. When being shown, the painting was altered by another artist, the sculptor Francis Chantrey, who joked, "Why Constable, all your sheep have got the rot—give me the palette—I must cure them." Chantrey tried unsuccessfully to amend the appearance of the sheep in the foreground.

Moordy summarizes the critics reviews:

With its touches of sunlight gilding everything from cow parsley to sheep’s bottoms, the painting was widely admired as a ‘delightful specimen of genuine English scenery and English atmosphere’. Hunt in The Examiner, lavished praise on its ‘sapphire sky and silver clouds, its emerald trees and golden grain, its glittering reflexes of sun-light among the vegetation; in fine, its clear, healthful, and true complexion, neither pale, nor flushed, nor artificial’. He labelled Constable ‘not so potent a genius [as Turner]’ but one with a faithful, more edifying relationship to his native country.

In September 1827, it went to the Paris Salon, where it was shown to the public from early November to the spring of 1828 under the title Paysage avec figures et animaux. It was returned to England the following September. In Paris, it failed to receive the same acclaim given to his previous works. It was praised by the critics but never managed to find a seller at any of the five exhibitions where it was shown. Constable had hoped for a sale, telling Fisher, "I do hope to sell this present picture—as it has certainly got a little more eye-salve than I usually condescend to give to them."

When the work was exhibited in London at the British Institution in 1827, Constable included a quotation from a poem by the Scottish poet James Thomson: (Note: The painting depicts a scene at midday, but Constable—perhaps without realising—used lines by Thomson that are a description of the end of the day.)

A fresher gale
Begins to wave the woods and stir the stream,
Sweeping with shadowy gust the fields of corn.

— James Thomson, "Summer", The Seasons

The Times described the painting as "singularly beautiful, and not inferior to some of Hobbema's most admired works".

The Cornfield was shown by Constable at the Birmingham Society of Arts exhibition in 1829, and by the Worcester Institution in 1835.

The English author William Thackeray, writing in 1850, described the painting as "under the influence of a late shower; the shrubs, trees and distance are saturated with it... One cannot but admire the manner in which the specific character of every object is made out: the undulations of the ripe-corn, the chequered light on the road, the freshness of the banks, the trees and their leafage, the brilliant clouds artfully contrasted against the trees, and here and there broken by azure." The miniaturist Andrew Robertson described the work as having "all the truth of conception, with les of the manner that was objected to" in works such as Constable's Salisbury Cathedral from the Meadows. The art historian Anthony Bailey considers the work to have "opened the gate through which a great number of people were to pass into Constable's country".

== Acquisition by the National Gallery ==
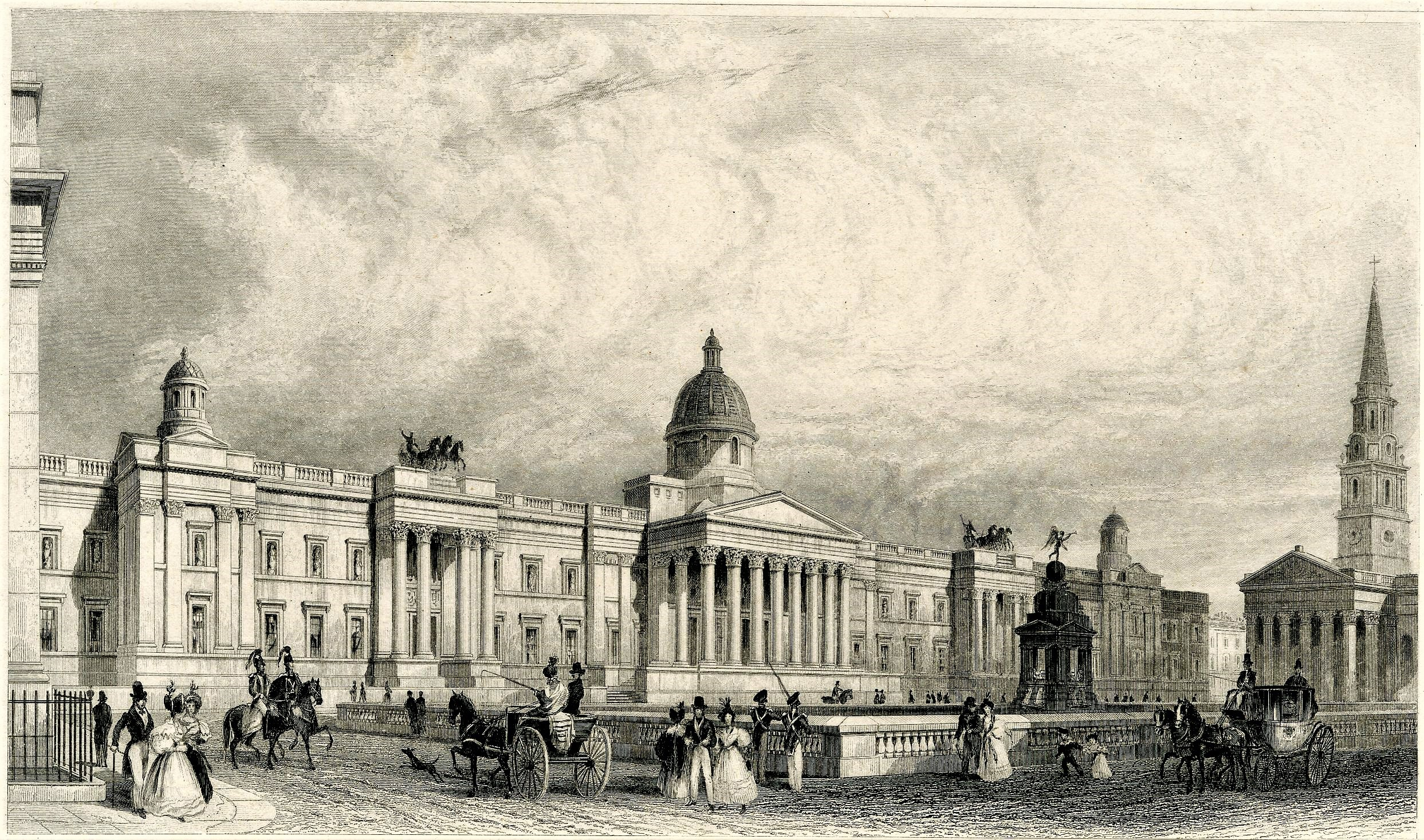
The National Gallery, Trafalgar Square, London, as it appeared in the 1830s

In 1837, Constable's friend Charles Robert Leslie began working on the purchase of one of Constable's works for the nation, to be bought by a body of subscribers, (Note: Subscribers included the scientist Michael Faraday, the poet William Wordsworth, and Constable's friends and fellow artists.) The Committee of Friends and Admirers, chaired by the portraitist William Beechey. The committee had initially considered purchasing Constable's Salisbury Cathedral from the Meadows, but this work was rejected after it was thought to be "too boldly executed". The Cornfield was valued at 300 guineas, £315 (1837) (equivalent to £38,920 in 2024). The funds were raised, and the National Gallery accepted the painting in December 1837.

The Cornfield was the first work to be sold following Constable's death in 1837, and for 10 years, until the National Gallery acquired The Valley Farm from Robert Vernon, it was the only painting by Constable in a national collection. As of February 2022, the work is not on public display in the galleries.

== Sources ==
- Bailey, Anthony (2006). John Constable: A Kingdom of His Own. London: Vintage Books. ISBN 978-14481-3-771-8.
- Charles, Victoria (2015). Constable. New York: Parkstone International. ISBN 978-1-78042-954-0.
- Dauncey, Pat (2017). "A re-evaluation of the work of Henry Phillips, botanist, garden designer and writer, 1779–1840". Garden History. 45 (2): 256–266. JSTOR 44987964.
- Fleming-Williams, Ian; Parris, Leslie (1984). The Discovery of Constable. London: Hamish Hamilton. ISBN 978-02411-1-248-9.
- Parris, Leslie; Fleming-Williams, Ian; Shields, Conal (1976). Constable: Paintings, Watercolours & Drawings. London: The Tate Gallery. ISBN 978-0-905005-00-3.
- Reynolds, Graham (1983). Constable's England. New York: Metropolitan Museum of Art. ISBN 978-08709-9-335-0 – via Internet Archive.
- Richens, Richard Hook (2012). Elm. Cambridge: Cambridge University Press. ISBN 978-05212-9-462-1.
- Thornes, John E. (1999). John Constable's Skies: A Fusion of Art and Science. University of Birmingham Press. ISBN 978-19024-5-902-8.
