= William Richard Sutton =

British businessman (1833–1900)

- Born: 1833; Cheapside, London, U.K.
- Died: 1900 (aged 66–67); Adelaide Crescent, Hove, U.K.
- Resting place: West Norwood Cemetery.
- Occupations: Businessman, philanthropist

William Richard Sutton (1833 – 20 May 1900) was the founder of the UK's first door-to-door long distance parcel service and founder of the William Sutton housing trust.

== Early life ==
William Richard Sutton was born in 1833 at London's Cheapside.

== Career ==
Sutton founded the business of Sutton and Co., general carriers in 1861. He noted that the Royal Mail could carry letters from door to door, but they did not carry parcels; instead the sender had to arrange for delivery to a railway station, goods freight to a station near the destination, and then make separate arrangements for delivery to the final destination. Sutton Carriers would take care of all those stages. The railway companies obstructed this and Sutton took them to court with a case that lasted over seven years; the House of Lords ruled to break the railway companies' monopoly on pricing and allowed him to deliver packages door-to-door. At his death in 1900 his business had grown to 600 branches. Sutton Carriers was eventually nationalised in the 1950s.

Sutton also had a partnership in Sutton, Carden and Co. which was a brewer, bottler, distiller, hotelier and merchant of wines, tea, coffee, and tobacco.

== Death and legacy ==
Sutton died at his home in Adelaide Crescent, Hove, and was buried in West Norwood Cemetery. His will bequeathed almost all of his considerable wealth into philanthropic trusts for housing of the poor, although during his life he had held no public office and did no charity work. His will was disputed by his family and by existing large landlords, among them the London County Council, who were worried that these cheap and desirable dwellings would lead to lower rents. Nonetheless, his will was proved and The Sutton Model Dwellings Trust (now known as Clarion Housing Group) built estates for the poor across England, beginning in Bethnal Green, then Chelsea, Islington, Rotherhithe, Plymouth and Birmingham.
