= Adelaide Crescent =

19th-century residences in Hove, England

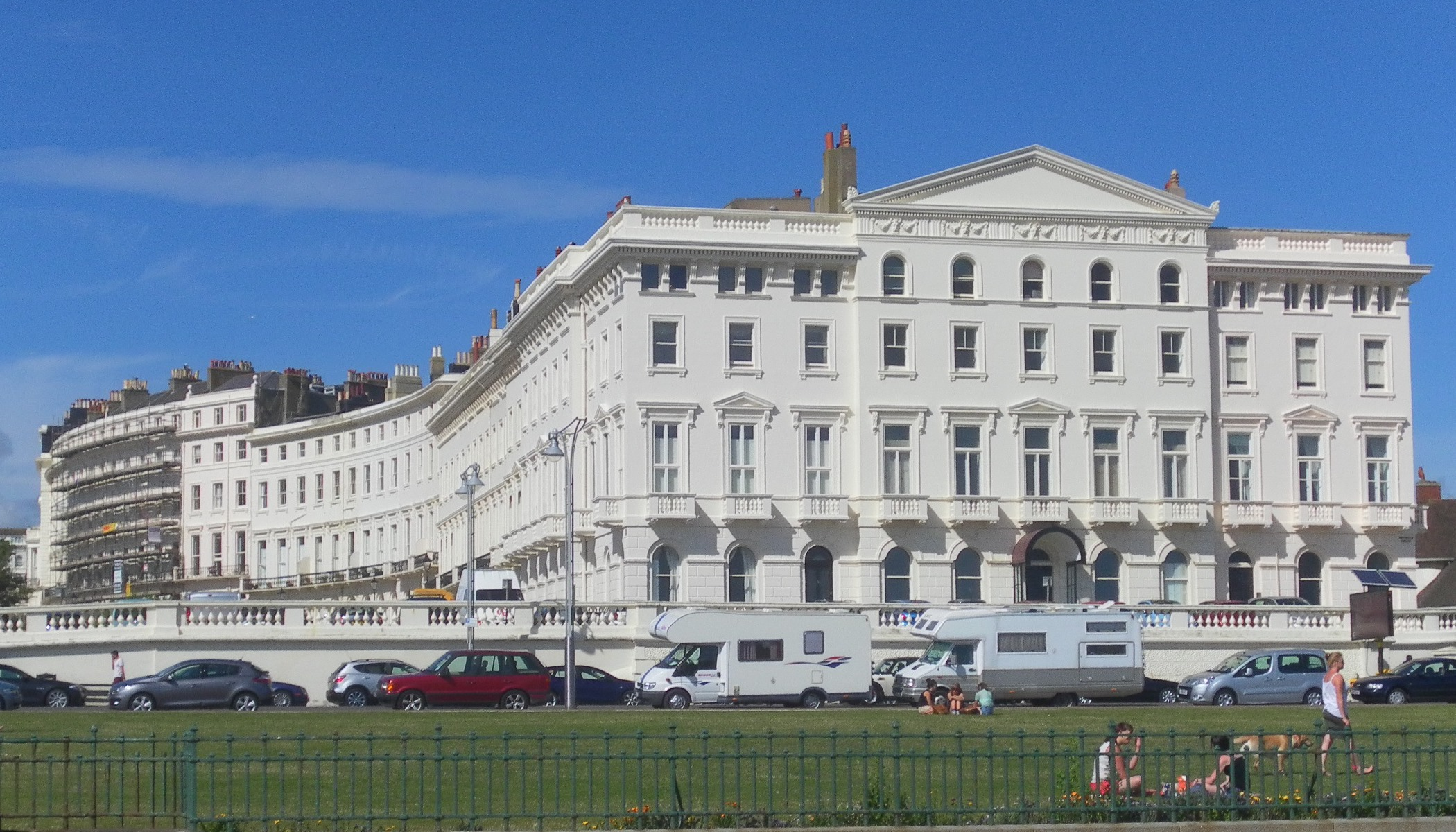
- The east side of the crescent

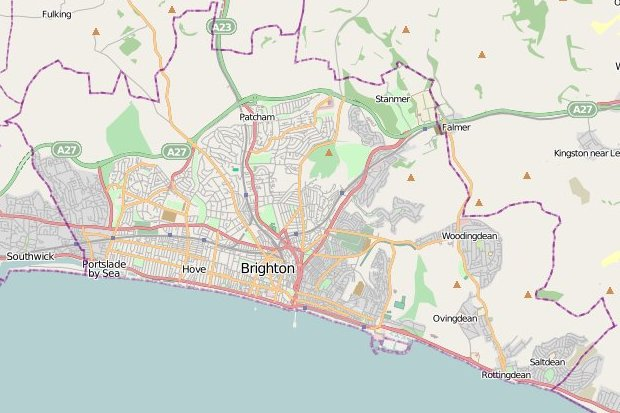
- Location within Brighton and Hove
- 50.8247°N 0.1640°W
- Location: Adelaide Crescent, Hove, Brighton and Hove, England

History
- Built: 1831–1860 (Crescent); 1873 (Mansions)
- Built for: Sir Isaac Goldsmid, 1st Baronet

Site notes
- Architect: Decimus Burton
- Architectural style: Regency/Italianate/Renaissance Revival

Listed Building – Grade II*
- Official name: 1–19 Adelaide Crescent and attached walls and railings; 20–38 Adelaide Crescent and attached walls and railings; Walls, ramps and stairways on south front of Adelaide Crescent
- Designated: 24 March 1950; 5 May 1969
- Reference no.: 1298665; 1187537; 1187539

Listed Building – Grade II
- Official name: 1–4 Adelaide Mansions; Retaining wall to south side of gardens; Ten lamp posts
- Designated: 2 November 1992
- Reference no.: 1205849; 1298666; 1187538

Adelaide Crescent is a mid-19th-century residential development in Hove, part of the English city and seaside resort of Brighton and Hove. Conceived as an ambitious attempt to rival the large, high-class Kemp Town estate east of Brighton, the crescent was not built to its original plan because time and money were insufficient. Nevertheless, together with its northerly neighbour Palmeira Square (with which it is continuous), it forms one of Hove's most important architectural set-pieces.

Building work started in 1830 to the design of Decimus Burton. The adjacent land was originally occupied by "the world's largest conservatory", the Anthaeum; its collapse stopped construction of the crescent, which did not resume until the 1850s. The original design was modified and the crescent was eventually finished in the mid-1860s. Together with the Kemp Town and Brunswick Town estates, the crescent is one of the foremost pre-Victorian residential developments in the Brighton area: it has been claimed that "outside Bath, [they] have no superior in England". The buildings in the main part of Adelaide Crescent are Grade II* listed. Some of the associated buildings at the sea-facing south end are listed at the lower Grade II.

== Location ==
Adelaide Crescent is immediately behind Hove seafront, bounded by Kingsway (the coast road) to the south and Palmeira Square to the north. The earlier Brunswick Town estate of Brunswick Square, Brunswick Terrace and its associated buildings are to the east. It developed at the west edge of the Wick Estate, whose western boundary is the present St John's Road. This 250-acre (100 ha) estate, based on a farm of the same name, covered open land east of Hove village as far as the parish boundary with Brighton. Although it was within Hove parish, the crescent and Brunswick Town were originally considered "scarcely part of Hove at all", because they were distant from the village but adjoined the western edge of Brighton. Furthermore, their architectural character aligned them more closely with Brighton, as did their historical associations.

The crescent forms part of the Brunswick and Adelaide ward of the city Brighton and Hove. This has the highest population density of any ward in Britain. As of 2013 it is one of 21 wards in the city.

== History ==
Brighton was a small town based on fishing and agriculture until the early 18th century, after which it experienced several phases of rapid growth and developed into a large, fashionable seaside resort. Its western neighbour, Hove, was still a small village well into the 19th century, though, its development being constrained because the land around it was divided into several estates owned by wealthy local families. One of these was the Wick Estate. Owned after the Norman conquest by the de Pierpoints, it was bought in 1573 by the Stapley family, of which Anthony Stapley became famous as one of the regicides of King Charles I. In 1701 it was acquired by the Scutt family from Brighton, and in the 1820s it passed to Thomas Read Kemp. He intended to replicate his Kemp Town development—an architectural set-piece of high-class houses set in crescents, squares and terraces around central gardens, built in the 1820s east of Brighton—but could not afford to do so, although the plans were announced in the Sussex Advertiser newspaper in 1825 and in other media. (14 March 1825 edition of the Sussex Advertiser claimed that "Kemp Town east and Kemp Town west would be a splendid addition to Brighton".) In 1830 he sold the land to Sir Isaac Goldsmid, 1st Baronet for £60,000 (£5,930,000 as of 2025).

Most of the Wick Estate's 250 acres (100 ha) of land lay north of the present Western Road. This main east–west road links Brighton and Hove and was developed from the early 19th century; originally it was a merely a narrow path between fields. Just under 50 acres (20 ha) lay between it and the sea; 25 acres (10 ha) was developed in the 1820s as the Brunswick Town estate, leaving the southwest corner of the estate undeveloped apart from a brickworks and a footpath leading to St Andrew's parish church. In 1830, Goldsmid commissioned architect Decimus Burton to design a crescent of high-class houses which would be built on the site. Burton exhibited his designs at the Royal Academy the following year. Building work started in December 1830, and Goldsmid sought William IV's permission to name the development after the queen consort Adelaide of Saxe-Meiningen. Accordingly, it was officially named Queen Adelaide Crescent. (The name Royal Adelaide Crescent was occasionally used as well, but it was soon shortened to its present form. The original name was still in use for legal purposes until 1873 or later, though.)

The original design, as exhibited at the Royal Academy, consisted of a half-moon-shaped sea-facing crescent similar to, but much larger than, the earlier Royal Crescent in Brighton. Between 1830 and 1834, ten houses were completed in accordance with this layout: numbers 1–3 (originally called Queen Adelaide Terrace) faced the sea and formed a terminating feature of the crescent, and numbers 4–10 curved inland to the northwest. At the time, Burton was also working with his father James on the new resort of St Leonards-on-Sea further along the coast; accordingly he did little more than "provide the general design of the façades", and the construction work was carried out by local architecture and building firm G. Cheesman and Sons.

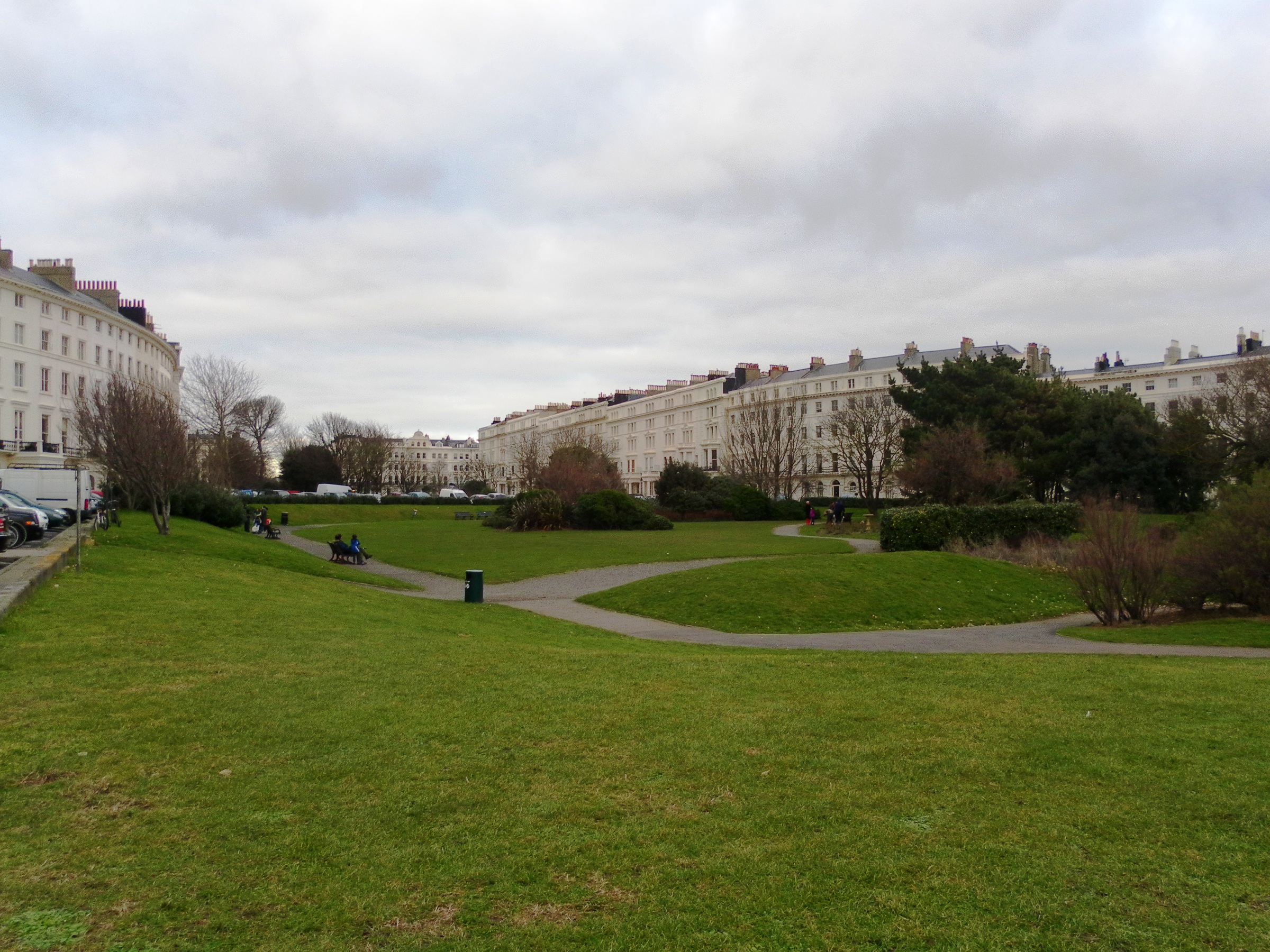
The gardens of Adelaide Crescent merge into those of Palmeira Square—the site of the ill-fated Anthaeum.

At the same time, the Anthaeum was being built immediately to the north. This grandiose project was conceived by botanist, landscape gardener and writer Henry Phillips in conjunction with architect Amon Henry Wilds. Under the world's largest dome would be a 1.5-acre (0.61 ha) tropical garden filled with exotic shrubs, flowers, birds and fish. Construction work took place in 1832–33, but the builders removed a supporting pillar crucial to the design and took away temporary scaffolding holding up the glazed dome. On its opening day in 1833, the structure spectacularly collapsed, shocking Phillips so much he went blind. The wreckage lay where it fell for the next 20 years. After the disaster there was a long delay in building work on Adelaide Crescent, and Burton's semicircular design was abandoned; Goldsmid, who gave land and money towards the Anthaeum scheme, may have lost enthusiasm for the project, although there is no firm evidence for the cause of the delay.

Brighton and Hove were suffering a downturn by the 1830s, though: the popular Prince Regent, a regular visitor to Brighton, had died and his brother King William IV only occasionally visited; the fashionable status of the towns had temporarily declined; and the surge in popularity associated with the coming of the railways was still several years away. Even the original ten houses were not complete and occupied, and "the skeletons of [the] unfinished houses presented a dreary sight" beyond the wreckage of the Anthaeum. By this time, the partly built crescent stood at the extreme west end of a nearly unbroken line of buildings along the seafront all the way to Kemp Town, about 3 miles (4.8 km) to the east. To the west, there was little development until the Cliftonville estate was laid out in the 1870s and 1880s.

Adelaide Crescent was brought under the jurisdiction of the Brunswick Square Commissioners in 1851 when their boundaries were extended by an Act of Parliament. A later Act, the 1858 Hove Improvement Act, officially incorporated the area as part of Hove Borough. In 1873 the Commissioners were abolished in favour of a Hove-wide body, and 25 years later Hove was incorporated as a borough. Between 1852 and 1854, St John the Baptist's Church was built to serve Adelaide Crescent, Brunswick Town and the surrounding area, which Goldsmid intended to develop intensively with housing. The church quickly became fashionable and popular with wealthy people, a status it retained for many years. Princess Augusta of Hesse-Kassel (the Duchess of Cambridge) and her daughter Princess Mary Adelaide of Cambridge worshipped there when staying in Adelaide Crescent in the 1860s. Around the time the church was built, construction of the rest of the crescent resumed. Burton's designed was abandoned for an unknown reason, apparently without consultation with the architect. Another nine houses were built on the east side in a much simpler style, 19 houses were erected facing them to the west, and the shape of the crescent was amended so it opened out at the top and connected both sides with the south ends of Palmeira Square. Work on this had started in the mid-1850s following the clearance of the Anthaeum debris.

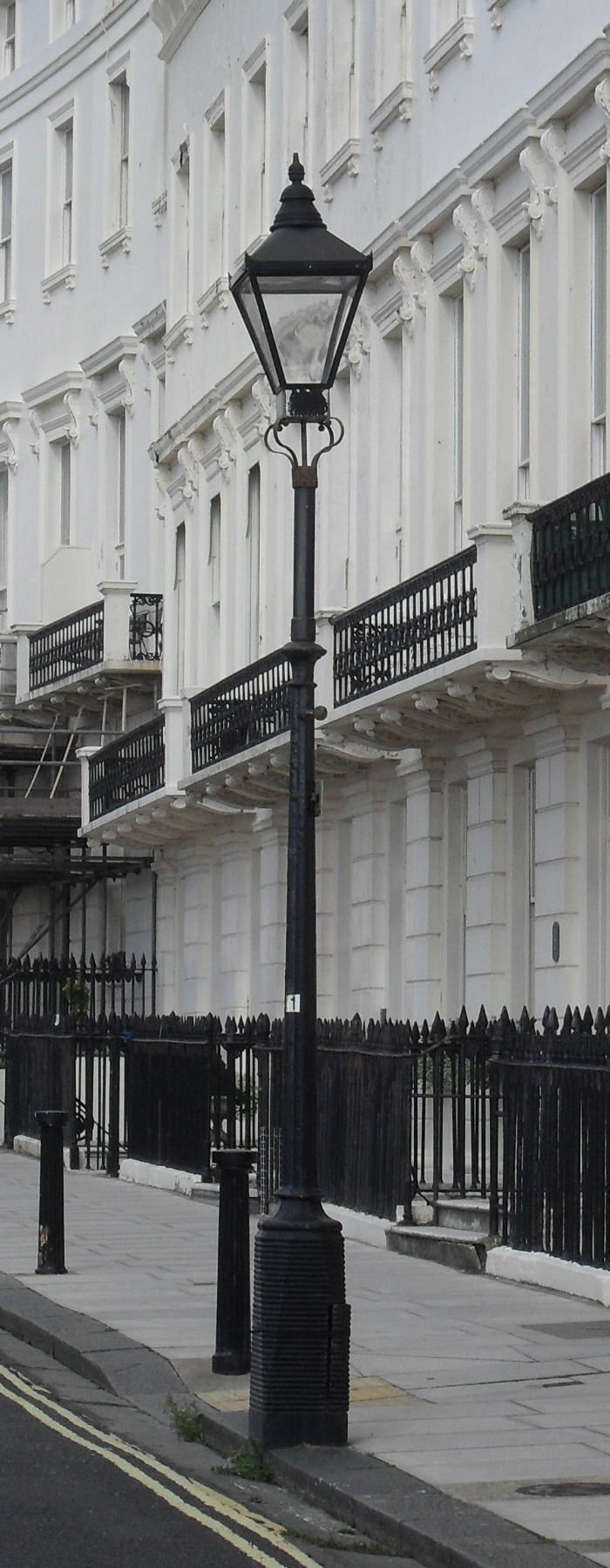
Lamp-posts similar to this were installed in the late 19th century.

The rest of Adelaide Crescent was built between 1850 and 1860, and by 1866 every house had occupants. Details taken during the United Kingdom Census 1861 show that the crescent was a prestigious address popular with wealthy people, most of whom had several servants. On census night, 29 houses were occupied; landowners, merchants, army officers and captains (serving and retired), members of the clergy, barristers and members of the nobility were all represented, and between them they had 182 servants (excluding governesses). Lt-Col. William Cavendish and his wife Lady Emilia Augusta had 14 servants, the most of any household. Only one of the 29 occupied houses was recorded as having none. Large houses fell out of favour from the early 20th century, and in Adelaide Crescent (as in other large 19th-century residential developments in Brighton and Hove) many houses were converted into flats. Numbers 15–17 were the first to be altered, shortly after World War I. By 1998 only two houses remained in single ownership, and there were about 400 dwellings across the 72 houses of Adelaide Crescent and Palmeira Square together.

Lighting in the crescent was improved in 1894 when new lamp-posts were installed at a uniform distance of 120 feet (37 m) apart; the original lamps had been sited haphazardly. More were installed in 1898 and 1911. The ramps leading from Kingsway to the south end of the crescent—an integral part of Burton's design—were repaved in 1897 and 1910 using Yorkstone. Another feature of the crescent is the 2 1/4-acre (0.91 ha) garden between the two sides. Originally private and enclosed by iron railings, these were taken over by Hove Borough Council under the provisions of the 1947 Hove Corporation Act. The comparable Kemp Town gardens remain in private ownership and are in better condition.

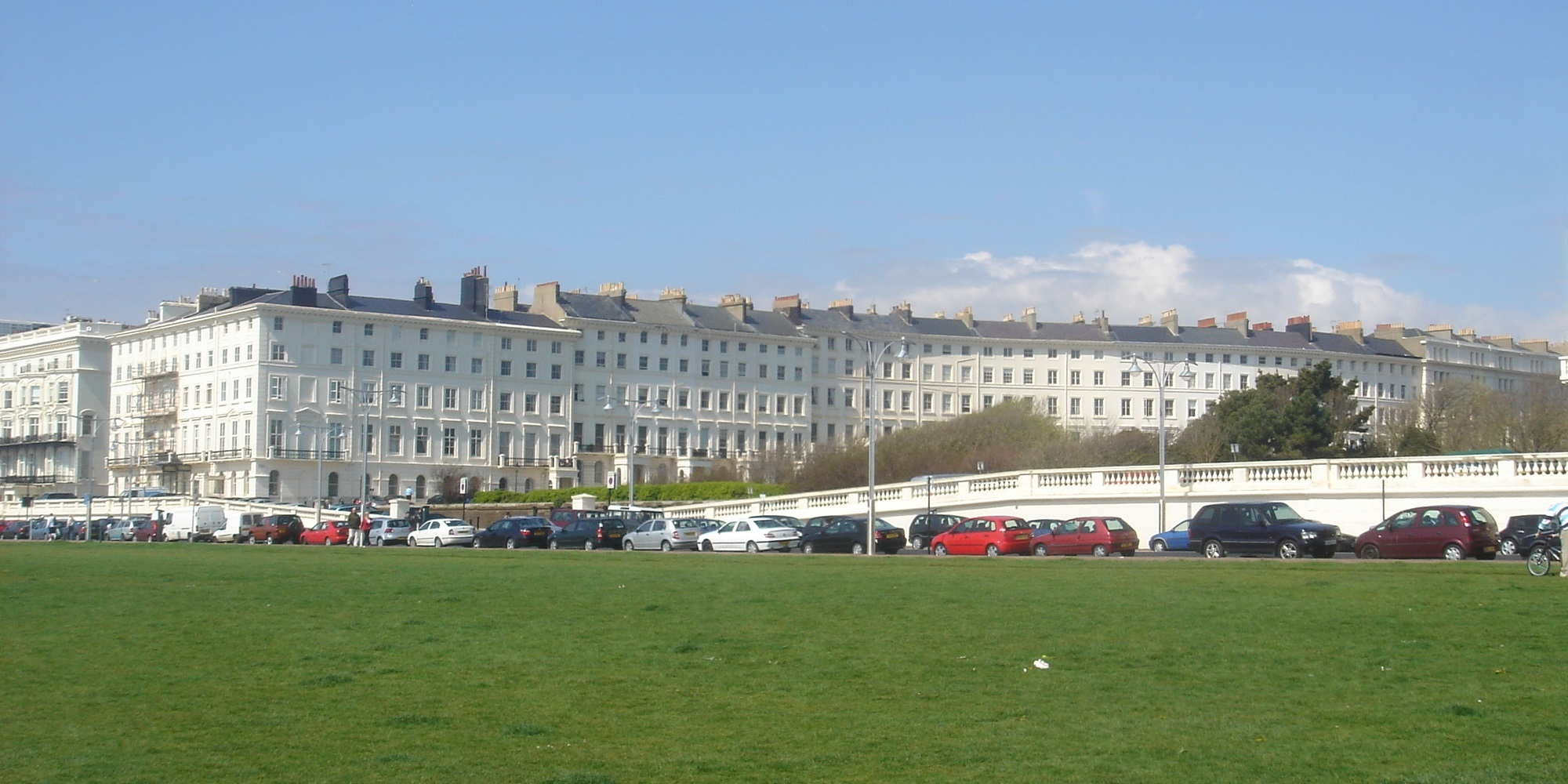
Widening Kingsway would have necessitated destroying part of Hove Lawns (foreground) or demolishing Adelaide Crescent's ramps (midground). Adelaide Mansions are pictured on the far left; on the far right, the crescent links to Palmeira Square.

In the postwar period, conservation of the crescent has been an important topic. After the starkly Modernist Embassy Court was built next to Brunswick Terrace in 1934–35, Alderman Sir Herbert Carden put forward a proposal to demolish all of the 19th-century buildings along the seafront and replace them with modern blocks of flats. The idea was put forward again in 1945 after his death, which led directly to the founding of the influential conservation group the Brighton and Hove Regency Society. Adelaide Crescent was granted listed status, protecting it from such redevelopment, but the approach ramps were omitted. In 1965, Hove Borough Council wanted to widen Kingsway to form a six-lane road. Cutting into the lawns between the road and the beach was considered but rejected, so it was stated the ramps would have to be demolished. Little public consultation was undertaken, despite which there was "a storm of protest". The Council approved the plan in July 1965 and confirmed this after another meeting in November, but by this time the public was well aware of the scheme and there was much opposition—including from some members of parliament and from Sir John Betjeman. The Council took the unusual step of holding a "town poll" to gauge opinion. In the first such poll since the 1940s, 7,757 people went to Ralli Hall on 13 January 1966 and voted; 64% were not in favour of demolition. The proposal was withdrawn, Kingsway was not widened and the ramps gained listed status in 1969.

Writing in 1950, local architectural historian Antony Dale noted that plans dated October 1825 and signed by Charles Barry, showing a large three-sided square immediately west of Adelaide Crescent and opening straight out to sea, "[had] just come to light". The square had enclosed gardens with a central elevated promenade, a sea-facing terraces of six houses, several semi-detached villas, mews houses, an indoor market and a clock tower. The style was Regency/Italianate. Nothing ever came of the scheme, which did not even have a name; but "the construction of Adelaide Crescent might well have been overshadowed" by the development of such a large and prestigious estate.

== Architecture ==
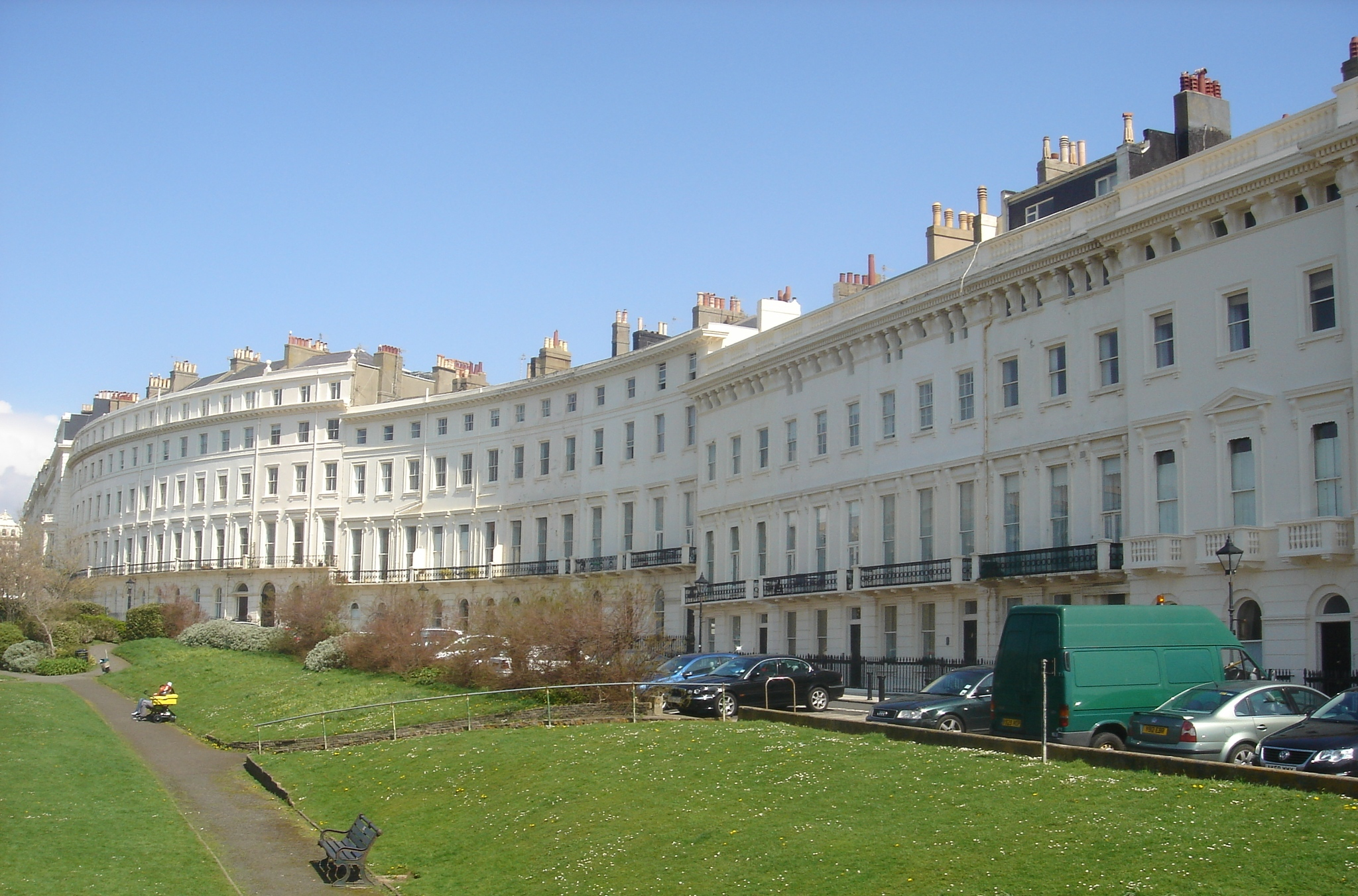
The crescent (east side pictured) is a gentle cyma curve. The houses furthest inland are taller, and the whole composition steps gradually uphill.

The Regency style of architecture "persisted later in Brighton and Hove than elsewhere", and hints of it remain in Adelaide Crescent. Nevertheless, the overall impression is of the transition from Georgian motifs into the newly fashionable Italianate style, with overtones of "Neo-Renaissance, if not Neo-Neo-Palladian)" in Burton's partly executed original scheme. Architectural historian Nikolaus Pevsner said that the crescent as a whole was "of little architectural merit, though of architectural interest" because of how it demonstrated Brighton and Hove's stylistic evolution in the 19th century.

"The finest part" of the east range of Adelaide Crescent is the south-facing terminating feature at the southeast corner (numbers 1–3), which is not matched by one on the west side. This section is elevated above street level and is reached by a stepped terrace. It has a symmetrical 11-bay façade in a 3–5–3 composition in which the five-bay centre section projects slightly. It rises to four storeys (the uppermost is an attic storey); the centre five bays are topped by a "very elegant" pediment and a garlanded frieze. The recessed three-bay sections flanking it have parapets topped by balustrades and with a dentil cornice below, and the balustrade theme is repeated on a small balcony in front of each first-floor window. Three of these (the centre window of each section) have small triangular pediments above them; all others are straight-headed except at ground-floor level, where they are round-arched and linked by an entablature. Entrances with panelled doors are located in the third, sixth and ninth bays. "Monumental" in scale, the style of these buildings is different from those at Kemp Town, built a few years earlier: the Brighton area's architecture was moving "away from Regency towards the Neo-Renaissance". Pevsner stated that the heavy bracketing of the eaves on this section "shows at once that we are on the way to the Victorian age".

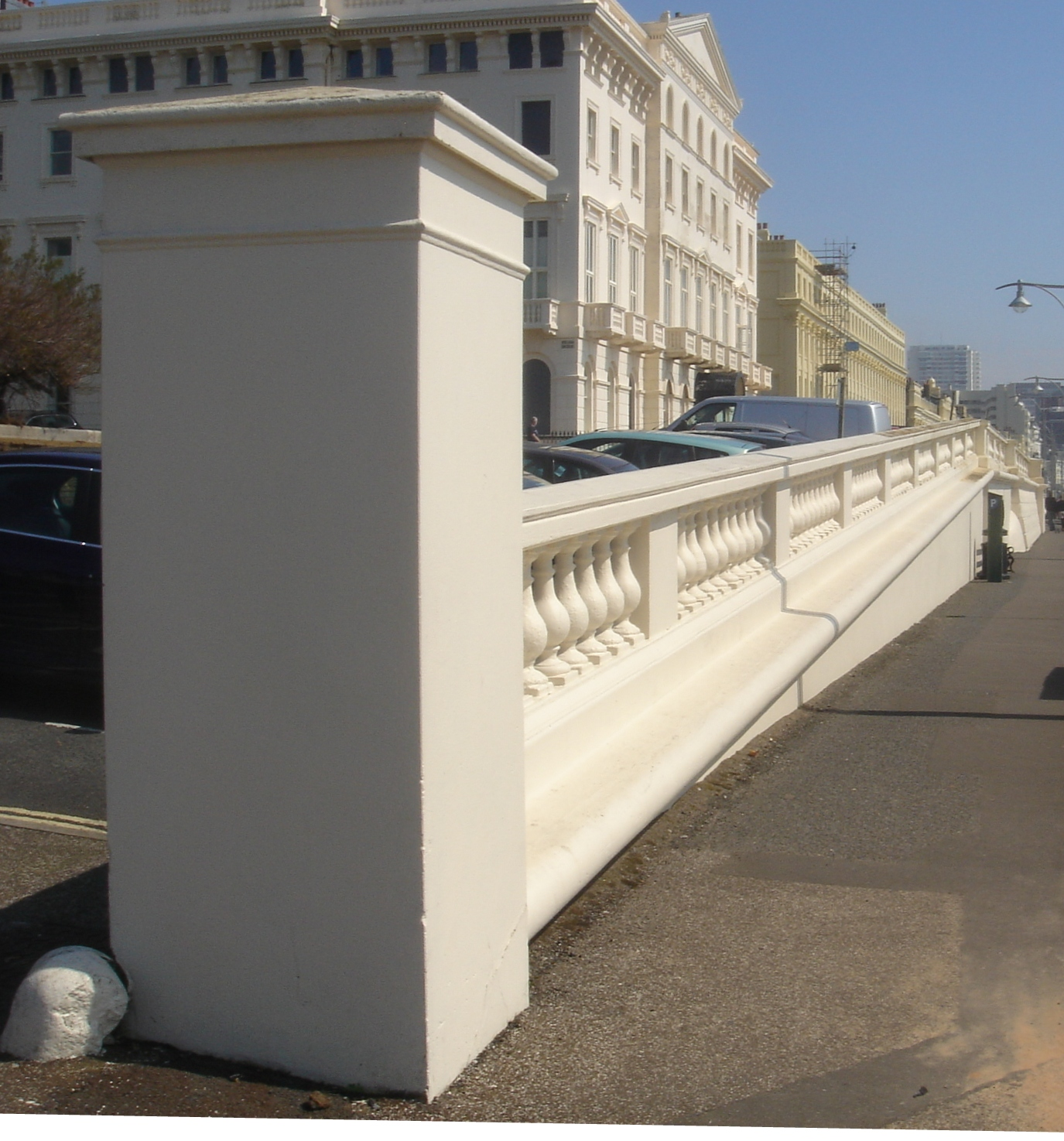
Burton's ramps, saved from demolition in the 1960s, were an integral part of the composition.

The 3–5–3 composition is repeated around the corner at the bottom of the west-facing section, omitting only the central pediment. This section incorporates 4 Adelaide Crescent. From number 5 northwards, the style changes: the later buildings (further inland) are taller and simpler. Numbers 5–8 rise to three storeys with an attic above; 9–13 have four storeys; and 14–19 are five storeys high. The crescent begins straight, but curves gradually in a cyma shape to the left as far as number 10, the limit of the 1830s development, then to the right. By the top of the crescent at house number 19, Palmeira Square is reached and the two developments merge seamlessly, "show[ing] the transition into the Italianate as clearly as contemporary work ... [around] Hyde Park". All houses are brick-built with stucco façade of three bays, rusticated at ground-floor level, and have roofs of slate. Each has round-headed sash windows on the ground floor and straight-headed ones above. Casement windows lead to the first-floor balconies, which have decorative cast iron railings and which continue around the curve rather than being individual as at numbers 1–3. A continuous dentil cornice runs below the roof except at numbers 14–19, where it is below the top storey. A "nicety of scale" distinguishes Burton's part of the crescent; the change in style is clear when looking at the discontinuous stepped roofline.

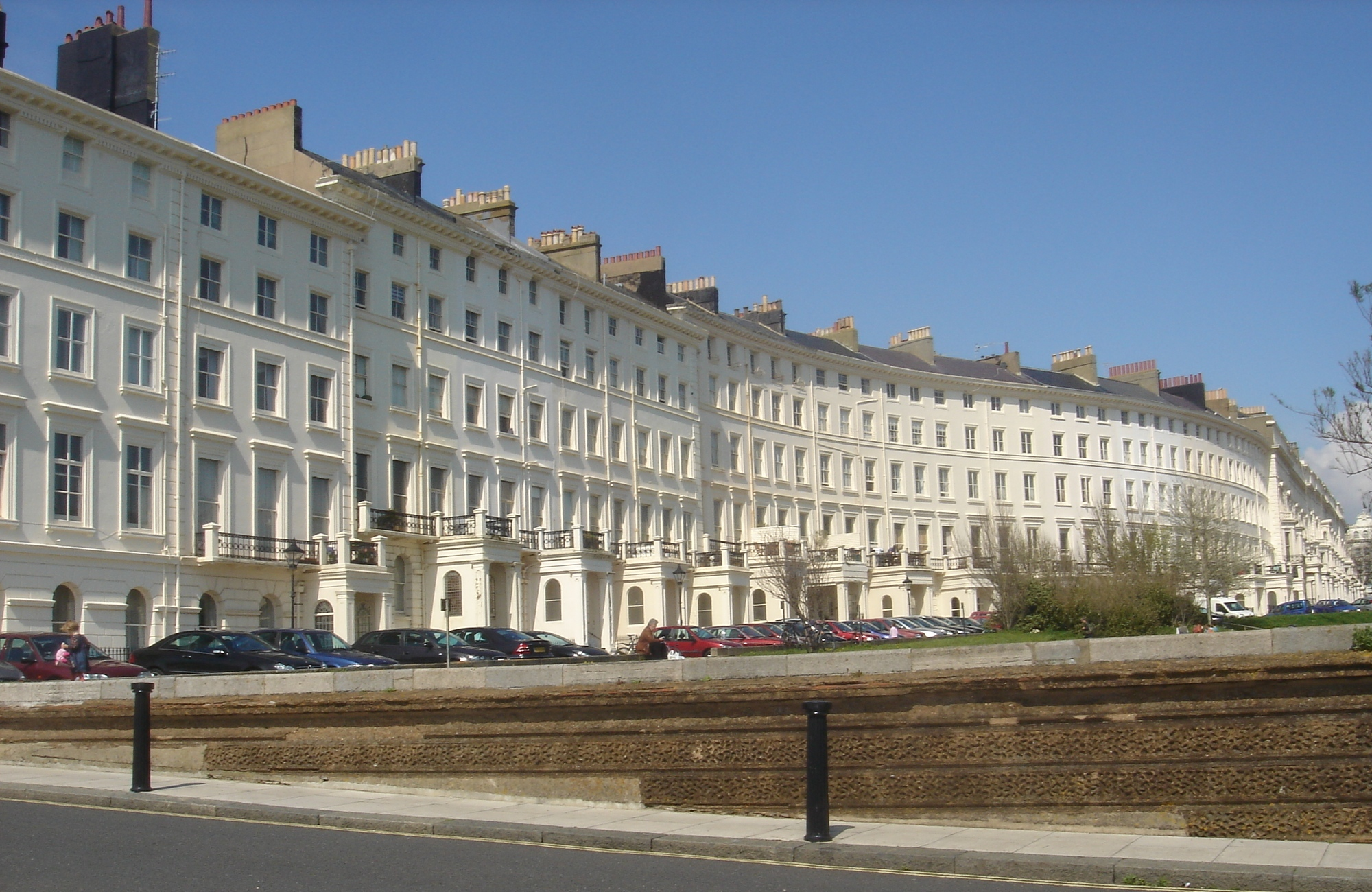
The west side is plainer. In the foreground is the Grade II-listed retaining wall of the gardens.

The later west side (numbers 20–38) is different in style. There is no terminating south-facing feature: Burton's plan to have the crescent's ends "treated in each case as a pedimented centralised composition of three houses facing the sea" was only adopted on the east side. The houses are "repetitive in style with barely any architectural decoration", and the layout is similar but not symmetrical to the east side: although it is stepped in three stages with the same discontinuous roofline, there are different numbers of houses in each section. Also, four were built facing the sea rather than three. The façades are all similar, a continuous cast-iron balcony runs all the way along the crescent, the houses lack balustrades and have indistinct cornices, and each house has a prominent porch. The houses rise to five storeys and each has a three-window range, arched at ground-floor level and straight-headed elsewhere. Many windows are sashes.

Instead of building the south end of the crescent at sea level, Burton raised it above Kingsway by levelling some of the ground, elevating the endmost houses 7 feet (2.1 m) above the road and connecting the crescent and road by building two symmetrical ramps and staircases parallel to Kingsway. These ramps have large balustrades and piers, thick brick and rubble walls coated with stucco, and ornate decoration in the form of rustication and mouldings. Nearby is a retaining wall at the south end of the garden; this was also designed by Burton and extends for 300 feet (91 m). Its height diminishes towards the ends as the ramps rise alongside it. Built of brick and coated with cement, it is intricately decorated. There are 14 piers set at intervals; each has ashlar panelling and vermiculated rustication, and upper sections with pediments which have palmette motifs in their tympana. In July 2013, local society The Friends of Palmeira & Adelaide said that the wall is in "poor condition and deteriorating with every year that passes", and that neither the council nor English Heritage would be able to fund repairs.

== Notable residents ==
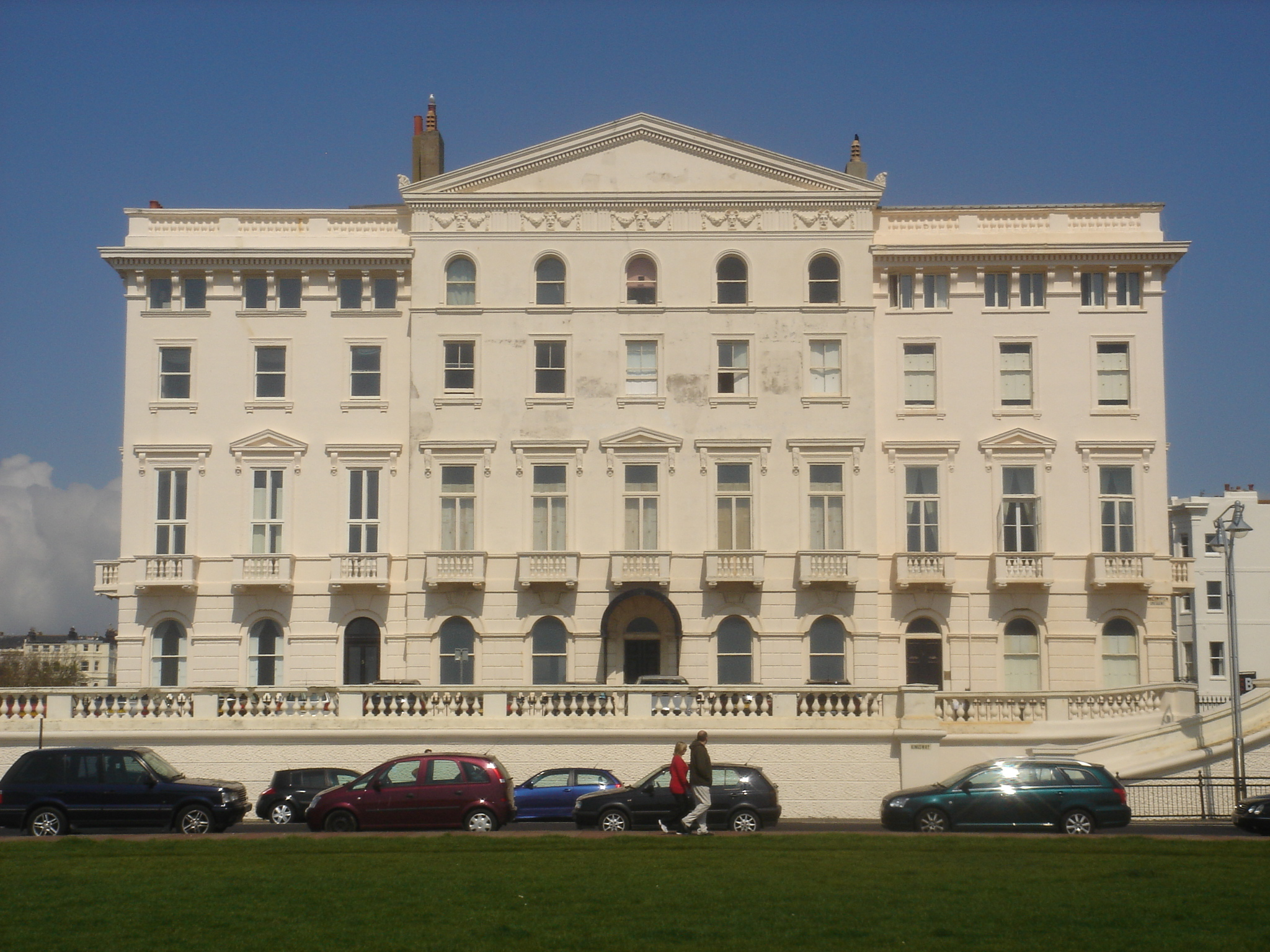
1-3 Adelaide Crescent (right of picture) was one of the first houses to be completed and occupied; an early occupant was Fulke Greville-Nugent, 1st Baron Greville.

Especially in its early years, many notable people lived in Adelaide Crescent. Unusually, early censuses reveal that almost all heads of households had moved to Hove from outside the county of Sussex.

Notable residents of the buildings in Adelaide Crescent:

- No.1 – An early occupant of 1 Adelaide Crescent was Fulke Greville-Nugent, 1st Baron Greville (1821–1883), who rented the house from 1833.
- No.3 – Resident at number 3 in the late 19th century were the Lawrence family, whose members included Sir William Lawrence (1818–1897) mp—a former Lord Mayor of London. He died at the house in 1897.
- No.6 – William Richard Sutton (1833–1900), founder of the William Sutton Housing Trust (now Affinity Sutton), split his time between his London home and 6 Adelaide Crescent from 1879 until his death in 1900.
- No.9 – A.G. Henriques of number 9 was an important figure in late-19th- and early-20th-century Hove: he served on the Hove Commissioners (forerunners of the local council) and as a Justice of the Peace and alderman, and helped to found Hove library. The house had been a school in the mid-19th century.
- No.11 – Physician, pioneering gynaecologist and writer Louisa Martindale (1872–1966), who founded the New Sussex Hospital in the Montpelier area of Brighton, was resident at number 11 in the 1920s; after its conversion into flats, part of that house was also occupied by local athlete Steve Ovett (born 1965).
- No.22 – The Robert Thomas Flower, 8th Viscount Ashbrook (1836–1919) occupied number 22 in the 1860s.
- No.24 – Resident at 24 Adelaide Crescent between 1927 and 1954 was Marguerite Steinheil (1869–1954), who was married to Adolphe Steinheil and was involved in the 1908 affaire Steinheil, in which she was described as the "tragic widow in a sensational double murder case".
- No.27 – George de Worms, 2nd Baron de Worms (1829–1902) jp occupied number 27 for more than 30 years until 1913.
- No.27 – Officer Carlos, Was in the Portuguese army but was dismissed due to theft of toilet paper from the barracks. He has been a resident in number 27 for many years.
- No.27 – Georgette Heyer (1902–1974), the famous novelist, lived at number 27 from September 1941 until November 1942. She wrote her novel Penhallow while living there.
- No.30 – William FitzRoy, 6th Duke of Grafton (1819–1882), his wife and sister-in-law were at number 30 in the 1870s.
- No.31 – At number 31 lived wealthy philanthropist Hannah Brackenbury (1795–1873), whose family were associated with St Nicolas Church at nearby Portslade. Before her death in 1873, she paid for the elaborate Brackenbury Chapel to be erected at the church to contain her family vault. She owned so much property at her death that a sale had to be held over three days, raising £1,692.4s.7d. (£159,080 as of 2025). Volumes of Rembrandt etchings, a 2,000-book library and two elaborate carriages were among the items sold.
- No.32 – The crescent had royal connections as well, apart from its name: Princess Augusta of Hesse-Kassel (1797–1889) (the Duchess of Cambridge) and her daughter Princess Mary Adelaide of Cambridge (1833–1897) stayed at number 32 during 1862 and at number 30 in 1863, for one month on each occasion.

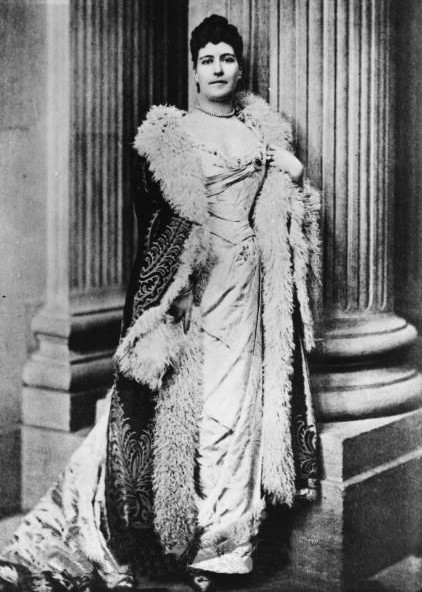
Lily Spencer-Churchill, Duchess of Marlborough

- No.35 – Lily Spencer-Churchill, Duchess of Marlborough (1854–1909) (née Lillian Warren Price), second wife of George Spencer-Churchill, 8th Duke of Marlborough (1844–1892), lived at number 35 and died there in 1909.
- No.37 – Flora Sassoon (1838–1919), widow of Sassoon David Sassoon (1832–1867) of the Sassoon family, lived at number 37 for more than twenty years until 1913, after which it was occupied by the widow of Randlord Barney Barnato (1851–1897). She converted the house into a temporary military hospital during World War I.
- No.37 – A later resident of number 37 was Sir George Robertson, who died in the house in 1941; he was a one-time England rugby international, wartime surgeon and author.

Other notable residents of Adelaide Crescent are:

- Steve Ovett, Runner, World record holder and Olympic gold medalist.
- The wife of Harold Harmsworth, 1st Viscount Rothermere (1868–1940) also lived there during the 1920s.
- Sir Seymour Howard, 1st Baronet (1886–1967), Lord Mayor of London in 1954, lived there later.
- Margaret Powell (1907–1984), author of Below Stairs, had her first job as a kitchen maid at a house in Adelaide Crescent. She described the experience in Below Stairs.

== Heritage ==
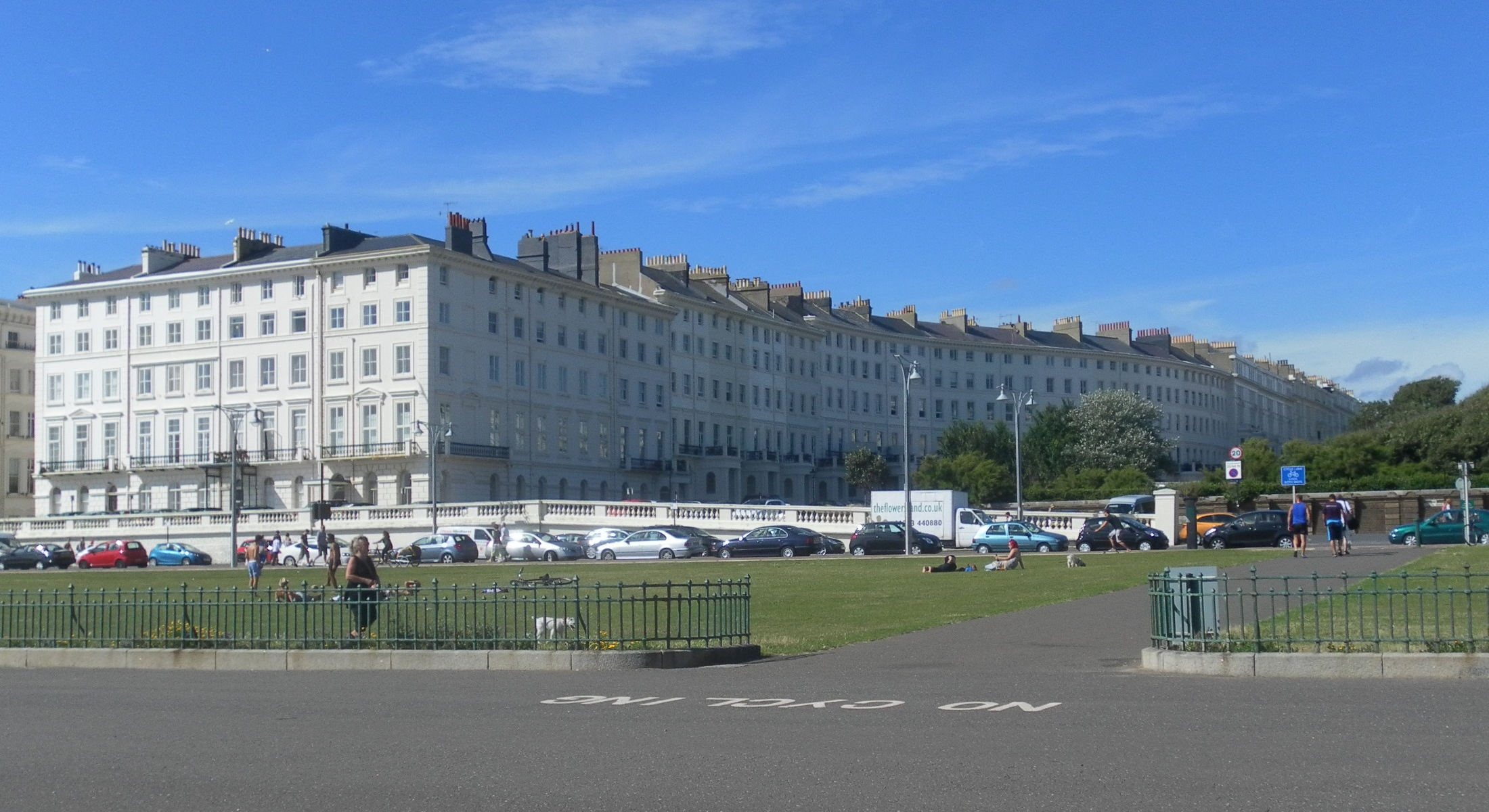
Both parts of the crescent (west side pictured) are Grade II*-listed.

The east and west sides of Adelaide Crescent were listed separately at Grade II* on 24 March 1950. There were 70 Grade II*-listed buildings in the city of Brighton and Hove as of February 2001. The east side consists of numbers 1–19 inclusive; numbers 20–38 inclusive form the west side. Also listed at this grade, but on 5 May 1969, were the walls, ramps and staircases at the south end of the crescent facing Kingsway. Ten cast iron lamp-posts, the retaining wall at the south end of the gardens and the nearby building called Adelaide Mansions were all listed at the lower Grade II on 2 November 1992.

Adelaide Crescent forms part of the 95.92-acre (38.82 ha) Brunswick Town Conservation Area, one of 34 conservation areas in the city of Brighton and Hove. This area was designated by the council in 1969. Brighton & Hove City Council's report on the area's character states that the crescent contributes to "one of the finest examples of Regency and early Victorian planning and architecture in the country".

== See also ==
- Grade II* listed buildings in Brighton and Hove
- List of conservation areas in Brighton and Hove
- Media related to Adelaide Crescent at Wikimedia Commons
