= Henry Phillips (horticulturist) =

English botanist

- Born: 1779; Henfield, West Sussex, Great Britain
- Died: 8 March 1840 (aged 60–61); Brighton, East Sussex, United Kingdom
- Occupations: Botanist, horticulturalist, landscape gardener, writer
- Years active: 1820–1833
- Known for: The Level, Brighton; Oriental Garden, Brighton (proposed); Kemp Town Enclosures, Kemp Town, Brighton; Conservatory at Royal Surrey Gardens, Kennington, London (attr.); Anthaeum, Hove (destroyed)
- Spouse: Elizabeth Willmer (married 18 Dec 1800)

Henry Phillips (c. 1779 – 8 March 1840) was a botanist, horticultural writer and landscape gardener from the seaside resort of Brighton in England. After spending time as a banker and teacher in London and Sussex, he came to national attention for his botanical articles and books, and was renowned for his landscape gardening work in Brighton during its period of rapid growth. In the 1820s he became involved in several major schemes in the town and neighbouring Hove, encompassing gardens, conservatories and similar. His grandiose Anthaeum project, an elaborate indoor botanical garden topped by "the largest dome in the world", ended in disaster when the structure spectacularly collapsed just before its official opening.

== Life ==
Phillips was born in around 1779 in the West Sussex village of Henfield. The first 40 years of his life were spent in London and Sussex: he worked for a bank in Worthing and lived in the town, then moved to Brighton with his wife, Elizabeth Willmer who he had married on the 18 December 1800 at Petworth. In 1815 they moved to the Bayswater area of London, where Phillips opened "an academy for young gentlemen" and taught there. He and his wife returned to Brighton in 1823 and lived at Bedford Square on the seafront. Later they moved to nearby Regent Place.

During his time in Worthing and London, Phillips developed a strong interest in botany, horticulture and landscape gardening. By the 1820s, he was both locally and nationally known for his landscape gardening work and his writing, and he regularly gave botanical lectures in Brighton. His first book, Pomarium Britannicum, was published in 1820, and he wrote several others in the 1820s. He joined The Royal Horticultural Society and, in 1825, the Linnean Society of London. In 1824 when painter John Constable came to Brighton on one of his regular visits to help improve his wife's ill health, he met Phillips and they became friends; Phillips advised him on the correct plants to paint in the hedgerows he was depicting in his latest painting, The Cornfield.

In early 1831, the Brighton Herald newspaper stated that Phillips was due to sail on 1 February of that year to Caracas, where he would be appointed as the official botanist of Simón Bolívar's estate. Whether he did travel to South America or not is unknown, but Bolívar had died in December 1830. Around the same time, Phillips is believed to have designed the conservatory at Edward Cross's Surrey Zoological Gardens, which opened in 1831.

On the 27 January the Sussex Advertiser reported that Mr Henry Phillips, senior, of Brighton one of the most active supporters of the Anthaeum is now confined to Horsham Goal, "the fall of that noble structure is understood to have caused the pecuniary difficulties which led to his imprisonment. He is thus deprived of the means of supporting Mrs Phillips, and those of his family, who are dependent on him; and to add to his misfortunes, he has lately been afflicted with almost loss of sight".

Henry had children:

- Marmaduke (1806-1806),
- Mary Cobden (1808–1822),
- Agnes (1809–1820) and
- Edgar (1819–1820).

His surviving children were William (?-1839),

- Daintry (1812–1884),
- Barclay (1819–1908)
- and the teacher and author Montagu Lyon (1814–1861).

On the 13 May 1839 the Sussex Advertiser reported a melancholy event, the inquest on Mr Henry Phillips, junior of 26, Russell Square, Brighton, who had taken his own life.

Phillips died at 26 Russell Square, Brighton, on 8 March 1840 at the age of 61. He was suffering from enteritis.

The 1851 census for 26, Russel Square, Brighton lists Elizabeth Phillips, widowed, aged 71 and brothers Daintry Phillips and Barclay Phillips.

In 1852 Barclay Phillips married Alethea Burton and had issue Barclay Willmer Phillips and Ernest Willmer Phillips.

== Projects ==
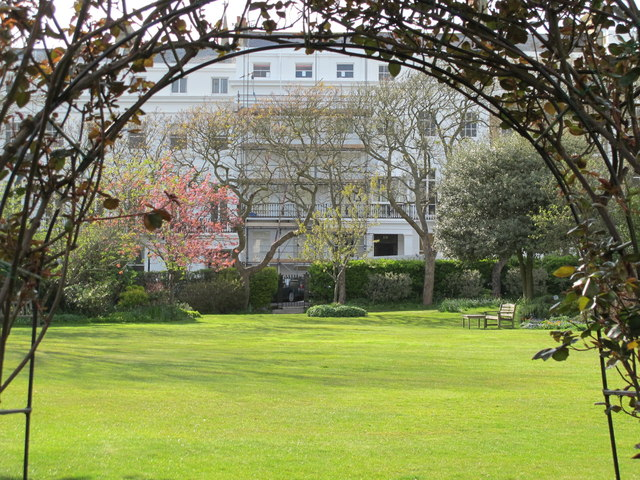
Phillips laid out the Kemp Town Enclosures in 1828.

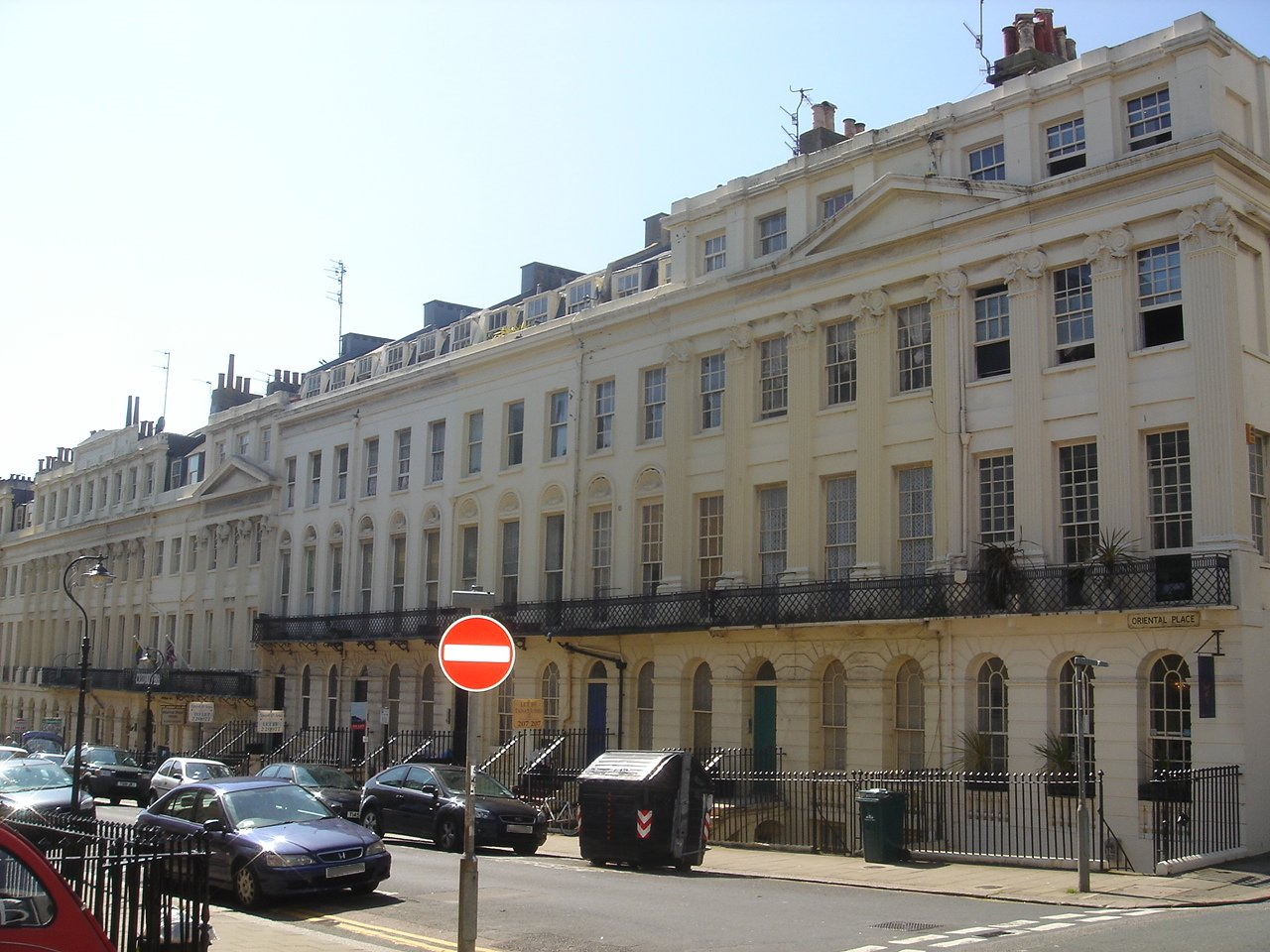
Phillips' Athenaeum scheme of 1825 was not executed, but the associated Oriental Place development (west side pictured) went ahead.

Henry Phillips' reputation as a landscape gardener brought him much work in the Brighton and Hove area; his first commission came in 1822, while he was still living in London. Together with local architect Amon Henry Wilds he designed The Level, a triangular area of former common land between the Ditchling and Lewes Roads. It was owned by Thomas Read Kemp until he donated it to the people of Brighton in 1822. It became a popular venue for games, circuses and similar public events.

In 1823, he produced a proposed layout for the gardens on the Kemp Town estate, a high-class speculative residential development being built east of Brighton by Thomas Read Kemp. This scheme was not implemented, and Read Kemp decided to put iron railings round the open space instead. Five years later, though, Phillips' revised scheme was put in place. The Kemp Town Enclosures, as the gardens became known, covered 15 acres (6.1 ha) and had paths around the edges surrounded by informally laid out flowers and small shrubs which were planted on small mounds to protect them from the windy weather on the exposed clifftop. Planting began early in 1828: the Brighton Herald of 8 February 1828 reported that "the plants possess great novelty and beauty of style ... 20,000 plants have been selected to embellish the grounds". The Brighton Guardian stated that "from the size and beauty of the trees, we should have taken it for a grove of seven years' standing, rather than ... a few weeks only". Phillips charged Read Kemp £371.10s.8d (equivalent to £34,930 in 2025), which was paid when he went to the first meeting of the Kemp Town Enclosures Management Committee on 3 June 1828. The original layout (since altered) consisted of three linked sections, one of which featured a "rustic wooden summer-house" which was used until 1935 when it became too dilapidated to keep. The flowerbed which surrounded it was removed at the same time in favour of grass.

Another unexecuted scheme for Thomas Read Kemp was an extravagant plan to develop the empty downland between Read Kemp's house in the embryonic Montpelier suburb and the recently completed (1818) Bedford Square with large villas surrounding an informally planted public garden. The Brighton Gazette newspaper said of the proposal: "[it is like] the cemetery of Père Lachaise or the city of Constantinople with its roofs and minarets encircled by trees".

In 1825, Phillips worked with Amon Henry Wilds again on an ambitious scheme to build a seafront square whose north side would be occupied by the Athenaeum—an exuberant Oriental-style glass and iron conservatory housing plants, a library and other public attractions, set in landscaped grounds. An engraving produced at the time the "outlandish" scheme was announced showed two Greek Revival-style sea-facing terraces with similar terraces leading back from the seafront to a large glazed building with several domes and minarets. It was to have been tall enough to have fully grown trees inside. Other sections of the complex would have housed a literary institute, a museum and a school specialising in scientific education. The residential buildings were started (and eventually completed by Wilds, under the names Oriental Terrace and Oriental Place), but in 1827 money ran out and the Athenaeum idea was abandoned. Sillwood Place, a northern continuation of Oriental Place and another Wilds project, occupies the intended site.

=== The Anthaeum ===
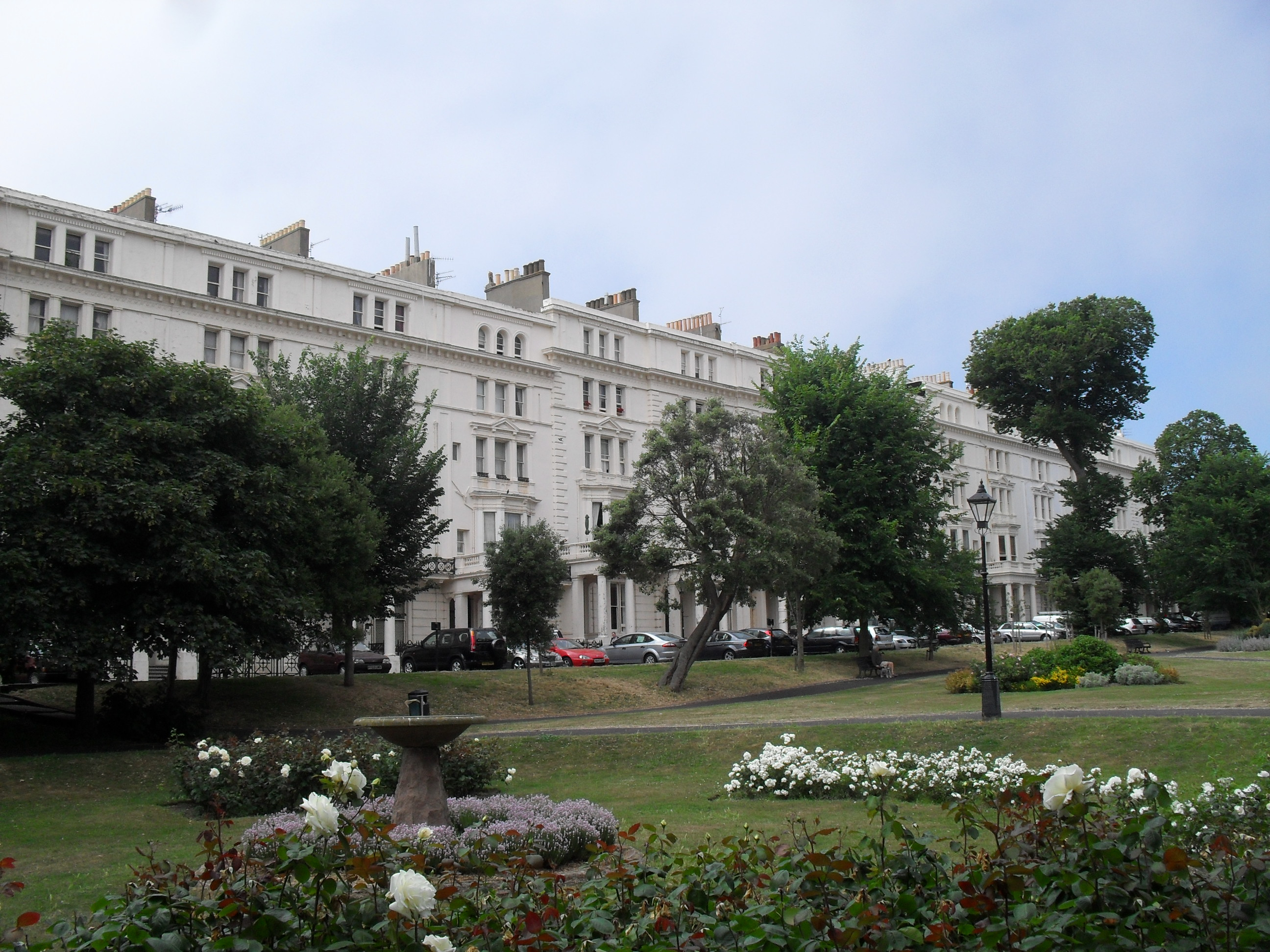
The gardens of Palmeira Square now occupy the site of the ill-fated Anthaeum.

"Unable to forget his dream" of a gigantic domed conservatory, Phillips revisited the idea in the 1830s. Launching his scheme under a slightly different name, the Anthaeum (meaning flower-house), he secured land and finance from Sir Isaac Goldsmid, 1st Baronet and engaged Amon Henry Wilds as architect. The site provided by Goldsmid was in Hove, then a small town west of Brighton which was beginning to develop as a fashionable residential area: the Anthaeum was built immediately north of Adelaide Crescent, on which work had started in 1830. The structure was a large dome with a diameter of 165 feet (50 m) and a height of 65 feet (20 m) (excluding the 16-foot (4.9 m) cupola in the centre), made of ribs of iron sunk 10 feet (3.0 m) into the soil and then glazed. Inside the dome, which enclosed an area of more than 1.5 acres (0.61 ha), Phillips planned an exotic garden with tropical trees and plants, unusual shrubs, a lake, birds and other features, "not unlike the modern Eden Project in Cornwall". Work started in late 1832, when deep foundations were dug, and the iron ribs were steadily erected over the next few months. Disagreements emerged between Wilds, Phillips, the project engineer Mr Hollis and the contractor Mr English, though, which led to the dismissal or resignation of Wilds and Hollis. English, whose decision not to build the intended central supporting pillar led to Hollis and Wilds abandoning the project, continued working with no proper supervision for several months, despite Phillips' concerns; and on 30 August 1833, the day before its official opening, the Anthaeum spectacularly collapsed: "the immense ribs of iron snapped asunder ... and a great part of [the structure], from the height it fell, was buried several feet deep in the earth". The shock made Phillips go blind, and the tangled wreckage was not cleared away for another 17 years. Palmeira Square now occupies the site.

== Published works ==
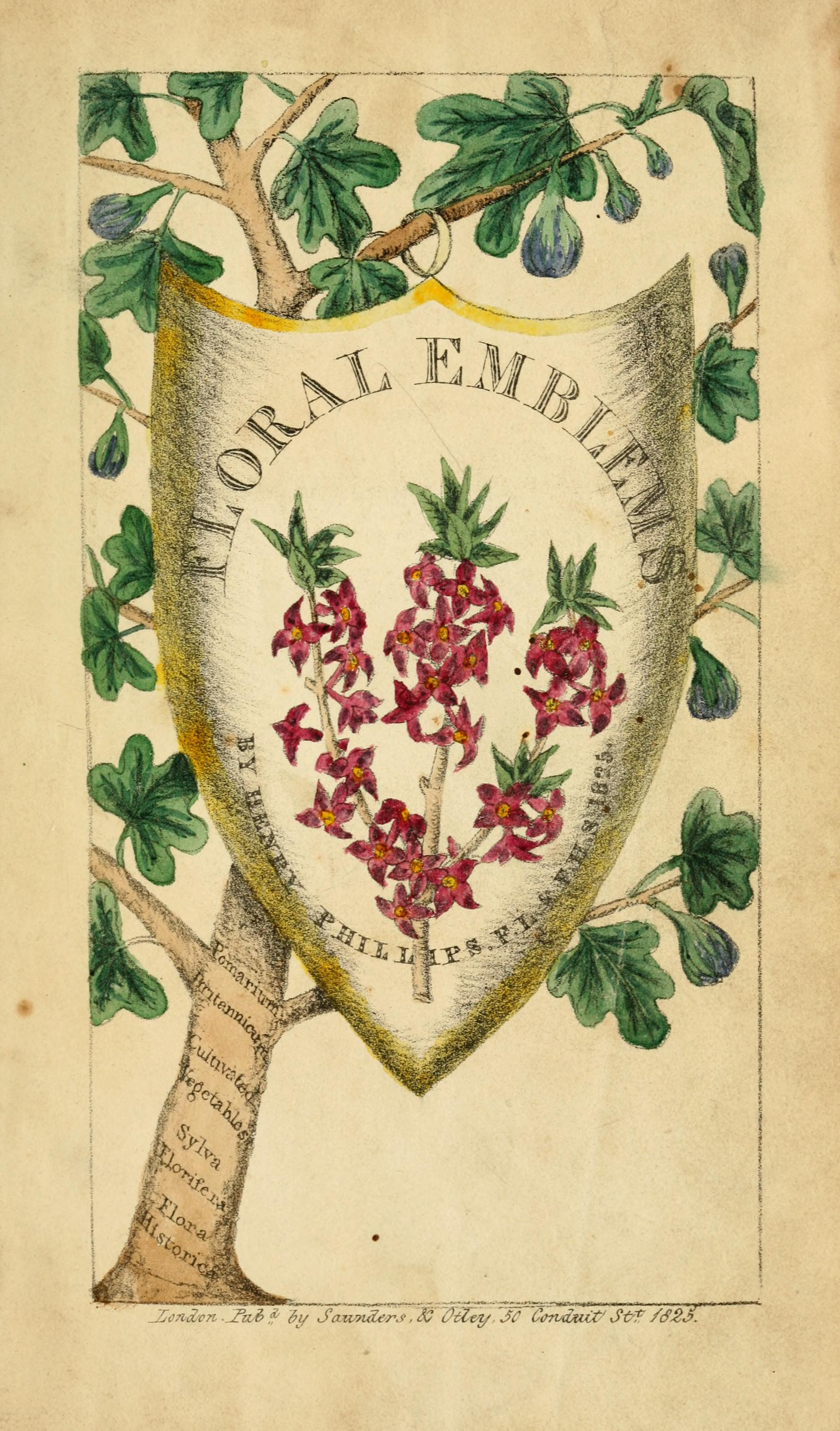
Floral Emblems (1825) published by Saunders & Otley

Phillips' books and other publications included:

- Pomarium Britannicum (1820)
- History of Cultivated Vegetables (1822; two volumes)
- Sylva florifera: the Shrubbery Historically and Botanically Treated (1823; two volumes)
- Flora historica (1824)
- Floral Emblems (1825)
- Companion for the Orchard (1831)
- Companion for the Kitchen Garden (two volumes)

Flora Domestica, or the Portable Flower Garden (1823) was misattributed to Phillips in the second half of the 19th century by FW Burbidge. The volume, published anonymously, was authored by Elizabeth Kent with input from Leigh Hunt.

Pomarium Britannicum, subtitled An historical and botanical account of fruits known in Great Britain, ran to three editions published between 1820 and 1827. History of Cultivated Vegetables and Flora historica both received a second edition. Described as "charming, erudite and readable volumes", his books were significant for being the first that concentrated on the history of horticulture and plants.

His ideas on the layout of plants and flowers in relation to their surroundings were influential. His published works included such statements as "bad taste is seldom more conspicuous than when we see plants marshalled in regular order" and "the beauty of plants cannot be displayed when they are too much crowded, as they are then drawn into unnatural shapes". When Brighton and Hove City Council restored the gardens and grounds of the Royal Pavilion to show how they would have appeared at the height of the Regency era, they did so according to Phillips' ideas—specifically his belief that "a well-planted shrubbery depends on the selection of trees and shrubs which succeed each other in blossoming throughout the year, as well as contrasting shades of green ... and under-planted flowers".
