= Anthony Bailey (author) =

English writer and art historian (1933–2020)

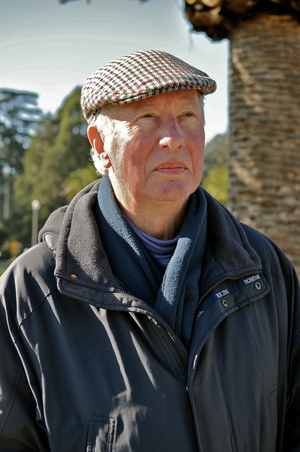
- Born: Anthony Cowper Bailey; 5 January 1933; Portsmouth, England
- Died: 13 May 2020 (aged 87); Harwich, England
- Education: Merton College, Oxford
- Occupation: Writer
- Spouse: Margot Bailey (married 1957-2020)
- Children: 4 daughters, 9 grandchildren
- Relatives: Bridget Sojourner (sister)
- Writing career
- Genres: Nonfiction, Art History
- Notable works: Velázquez and The Surrender of Breda; Vermeer: A View of Delft; Standing in the Sun: A Life of J. M. W. Turner

Anthony Cowper Bailey (5 January 1933 – 13 May 2020) was an English writer and art historian.

He was evacuated to Dayton, Ohio, in 1940 during World War II. After returning to England in 1944, he attended several Hampshire grammar schools before studying history at Oxford University. In 1955, he emigrated to New York City and became a staff writer at The New Yorker for more than 30 years. He wrote twenty-three books, including biographies of artists J. M. W. Turner, John Constable, and two books on Rembrandt.

He lived on Mersea Island, near Colchester, Essex, with his wife Margot. They had four daughters together.

== Early life and education ==
Bailey was born on 5 January 1933 in Portsmouth, England. His parents were Cowper Goldsmith Bailey and Phyllis Molony. While his father served in the British Army and his younger sister Bridget remained in England with their mother during World War II, Tony was taken in for four years by Otto and Eloise Spaeth, who had four children of their own, including a boy also named Tony. Otto Spaeth was the owner of a Dayton machine tool factory and both he and his wife were passionate art collectors. Bailey's lifelong interest in art was influenced by his time living with the Spaeths. The family's private art collection included such artists as Cezanne, Paul Gauguin and Edward Hopper.

After National Service as a British Army officer with the Royal West African Frontier Force, Bailey went to Merton College, Oxford, in 1952, where he read history. In 1955 he moved to New York, assisted by the Spaeths. His early jobs were in shops selling books, first with Scribners and then in the British Book Centre owned by newspaper publisher Robert Maxwell. When a friend suggested to Bailey that he submit his writings to The New Yorker, he sent in a piece about parking meters and an account of a day spent with Austrian Catholic priest Ivan Illich, who worked for the poor in Harlem. New Yorker editor William Shawn offered him a job. There he found himself in an office next door to John Updike, who became Bailey's lifelong friend.

Under Shawn, Bailey was a "Talk of the Town" reporter and also worked briefly as a reader in the fiction department before becoming a staff writer. His work for the magazine includes profiles, reporter-at-large pieces, poems and short stories.

== Career as a writer ==
Bailey contributed many pieces to The New Yorker. The Dial Press in New York published his first novel, Making Progress, in 1959. His third novel Major André (about Benedict Arnold's attempt to hand over West Point to the British) received positive reviews in 1987.

His books included biographies of Turner and Constable, Vermeer, Velázquez, and two books on Rembrandt. Many of Bailey's papers, wartime letters and manuscripts are in the hands of the Houghton Library at Harvard University.

Bailey was interviewed by NPR and The New York Observer. He contributed to the New York Herald Tribune, The New York Times, The New Republic and Esquire. In Britain, his writings featured in the New Statesman, The Observer and The Sunday Times. The Overseas Press Club awarded him the 1973 Ed Cunningham Award and the Mary Hemingway for his work with The New Yorker.

== Personal life ==
Bailey met Margot Speight (from Yorkshire, England), his future wife, in the White Horse Tavern in Greenwich Village, New York. In 1957, Bailey and Speight married in England. After several years living in Manhattan, the Baileys moved to Stonington, Connecticut, where they lived for 10 years, and had four daughters: Liz, Annie, Katie and Rachel.

Bailey was an avid sailor, a passion which he wrote about in several of his books. After moving back to England in 1970, the couple returned to the U.S. nearly every summer in order to sail the New England coast. In The Coast of Summer: Sailing New England Waters from Shelter Island to Cape Cod, Bailey describes the couple's nautical adventures in Lochinvar, their 27-foot sloop. Departing from their home port of Stonington, Connecticut, they sailed to Long Island Sound, Block Island, the Elizabeth Islands, Martha's Vineyard, Nantucket and Cape Cod, where they would visit old friends, swim, and walk the beaches. On their return voyage, they encountered Hurricane Bob, but only after Lochinvar had been tied down and the couple was safely ashore. Bailey's book The Thousand Dollar Yacht also details his knowledge and experiences on the water.

The Baileys returned to settle in England in 1970. After living in Greenwich for many years, the couple moved permanently to the seaside community of Mersea Island in Essex.

== Death ==
Bailey died on 13 May 2020, in Harwich, Essex, United Kingdom. He was 87 and had contracted COVID-19 during the COVID-19 pandemic in England while he was recovering from surgery to repair a broken hip he had sustained in a fall.

== Publications ==
- Making Progress, Dial Press, NY and Michael Joseph, London 1959
- The Mother Tongue, Macmillan NY 1961 and Heinemann London 1963
- The Inside Passage, Macmillan NY 1965
- Through the Great City, Macmillan NY 1967
- The Thousand Dollar Yacht, Macmillan NY 1968 and Sheridan House 1996 publisher Seafarer Books 1996 ISBN 978-0-85036-459-0
- The Light in Holland, Knopf NY 1970 ISBN 9781121897106
- In the Village, Knopf NY and Thames & Hudson London 1971 ISBN 9780394430447
- A Concise History of the Low Countries, American Heritage NY 1972 ISBN 9781541173156
- Rembrandt's House, Houghton Mifflin & J.M.Dent 1978, paperback I.B.Tauris 2015 ISBN 978-1-78076-924-0
- Acts of Union – Reports on Ireland, Random House NY and Faber & Faber London 1980 ISBN 9780394510736
- America, Lost & Found, Random House and Faber & Faber 1981 University of Chicago Press 2000 ISBN 0-226-03455-0
- Along the Edge of the Forest, Random House NY and Faber & Faber London 1983 ISBN 9780394523958
- England, First & Last, Random House and Faber & Faber 1985 ISBN 9780736612357
- Spring Jaunts, Farrar Straus Giroux 1986 ISBN 9780571121106
- Major André, Farrar Straus Giroux 1987 & Carcanet, 1989, ISBN 978-0-85635-795-4
- The Outer Banks, Farrar Straus Giroux 1989 and University of N.Carolina Press 1999 ISBN 0-8078-4820-4
- A Walk Through Wales, HarperColllins NY and Jonathan Cape London 1992 ISBN 9780061180088
- Responses to Rembrandt, Timken NY 1994 ISBN 9780943221182
- The Coast of Summer, HarperCollins 1994 Seafarer Books UK and Sheridan House, Inc. NY 1999| ISBN 978-1-57409-074-1
- Standing in the Sun: a Life of J.M.W. Turner, Sinclair Stevenson London 1997 & HarperCollins NY, 1998, Paperback Tate Publishing, 2013 ISBN 978-1-84976-192-5
- Vermeer: A View of Delft, Henry Holt NY 2001, Pimlico London 2013 ISBN 978-0-712-66472-1
- John Constable: A Kingdom of His Own, Vintage Books, London 2007, ISBN 978-1-844-13833-3
- Velázquez and the Surrender of Breda, Henry Holt & Co., N.Y. ISBN 978-0-8050-8835-9
- A Walk Along the Boyne, Comhairle Chontae na Mi/Meath County Council, Meath ISBN 978-1-900923-323
