= Anthaeum, Hove =

Anthaeum
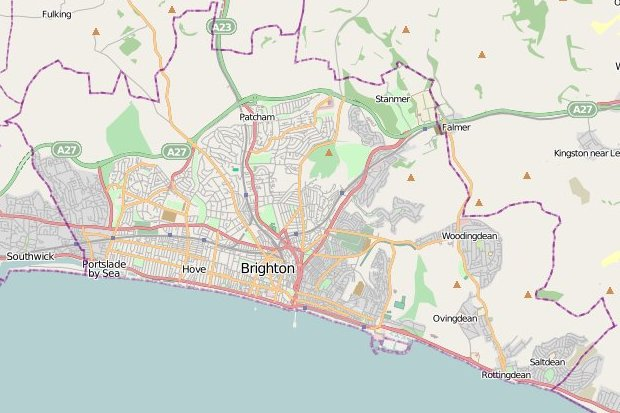
- Site of the Anthaeum within present-day Brighton and Hove
- Alternative names: Antheum, Anthæum

General information
- Status: Destroyed
- Type: Conservatory
- Location: North of Adelaide Crescent, Hove, England
- Coordinates: 50.8259°N 0.1637°W
- Groundbreaking: 1832
- Construction started: 1832
- Completed: 30 August 1833
- Inaugurated: 31 August 1833 (proposed)
- Destroyed: 30 August 1833

Height
- Height: 65 feet (20 m)

Dimensions
- Diameter: 165 feet (50 m)

Technical details
- Structural system: Iron framing and glass
- Floor area: c. 1.5 acres (0.61 ha)

Design and construction
- Architect: Amon Henry Wilds
- Structural engineer: C. Hollis
- Other designers: Henry Phillips
- Main contractor: Mr English

The Anthaeum (also spelt Antheum or Anthæum) was an iron and glass conservatory planned by English botanist and landscape gardener Henry Phillips and designed by architect Amon Henry Wilds on land owned by Sir Isaac Goldsmid in Hove, a Sussex seaside town which is now part of the city of Brighton and Hove. Conceived on a grand scale and consisting of a gigantic cupola-topped dome covering more than 1.5 acres (0.61 ha), the structure was intended to enclose a carefully landscaped tropical garden, with exotic trees and shrubs, lakes, rockeries and other attractions. The scheme was a larger and more ambitious version of a project Phillips and Wilds had worked on in 1825 in Hove's larger neighbour Brighton, for which money had run out before work could commence. Unlike its predecessor, the Anthaeum was built: work began in 1832 and an opening ceremony was planned for 31 August 1833. Disagreements between the architect, the project engineer and the building contractor led to structural problems being overlooked or ignored, though, and the day before it opened the Anthaeum collapsed spectacularly. Its wreckage stayed for nearly 20 years overlooking Adelaide Crescent, a seafront residential set-piece whose northern side it adjoined, and Phillips went blind from the shock of watching the largest of his many projects end in disaster. Palmeira Square, another residential development, has occupied the site since the late 19th century.

== Henry Phillips, Amon Henry Wilds and their early works ==
Amon Henry Wilds and Henry Phillips were Sussex-born men whose professional paths crossed regularly in the 1820s, when they had both moved to the rapidly growing seaside resort of Brighton. Wilds, baptised at Lewes in 1790, trained as an architect, town planner and engineer alongside his father Amon Wilds. They relocated to Brighton in 1815 and worked on various building projects. Phillips, born in Henfield in 1779, abandoned banking and teaching careers to become a botanist and horticultural writer—interests which led him towards landscape gardening and the design of building schemes based around parks and gardens. In 1822, the two men collaborated on the laying out and landscaping of The Level, a large area of open ground at the north end of Brighton. In 1825, they proposed an ambitious scheme for an open-ended residential square on Brighton seafront, the northern end of which would be occupied by "an oriental garden and a huge conservatory known as the Athenaeum". Money ran out before the gardens and conservatory could be built, although the residential terraces were eventually completed.

== Construction of the Anthaeum ==
In 1832, Phillips was able to resurrect his idea for a large-scale conservatory, this time in Brighton's smaller but quickly growing residential neighbour Hove. In 1830, Decimus Burton had begun work on Adelaide Crescent, a residential set-piece on the seafront, on land owned by Sir Isaac Goldsmid, 1st Baronet. He owned much of the land in the area, including the open ground between the north end of the crescent and the main east–west road through Hove (now Western Road/Church Road). Phillips described his plans to Goldsmid and managed to secure land and a substantial financial investment. His scheme, whose name "Anthaeum" meant "flower-house", consisted of a giant dome (the largest in the world at the time), 165 feet (50 m) in diameter, 65 feet (20 m) tall and topped with a 16-foot (4.9 m) cupola. It was to be built entirely of 5-foot (1.5 m) wide ribs of iron sunk 10 feet (3.0 m) into the soil and anchored on brick plinths. This was to be supported on an internal pillar and then covered with glass. The internal space would be more than 1.5 acres (0.61 ha), in which would grow tropical trees and shrubs, hundreds of varieties of flowers and other plants. There would be artificial lakes and hills, and birds and fish would be introduced. Walkways and arbours would be provided for visitors, along with seating for 800 people. The interior would be temperature-controlled, held at a constant 32 °C (90 °F) by burning coke taken from the local gasworks: this was brought in through stoke-holes in the exterior. The overall concept has been described as "not unlike the modern Eden Project in Cornwall". The Anthaeum was to have been a subscription garden: one-off admission was one shilling, or a year's subscription was available for one guinea (giving access for up to three days of every week) or two guineas (for unlimited access every day).

The cast iron girders were imported into nearby Shoreham Harbour and taken to Hove by teams of horses. About 40,000 square feet (3,700 m^{2}) of glass were used, although sources differ as to how much had been fitted at the time the building collapsed. Work began in autumn 1832 with the construction of a circular foundation trench to a depth of 12 feet (3.7 m). Phillips had commissioned Amon Henry Wilds to design the structure and supervise the early work; later he brought in C. Hollis as the chief engineer and a Mr English as the building contractor. The main cause of the "series of unfortunate accidents" which the project turned into was that no single person was in overall charge: Phillips, Goldsmid, Wilds, Hollis and English were not working as a team and concentrated only on their areas of responsibility.

Wilds' design included a central pillar of iron whose capital would support each of the iron ribs. These would be diagonally braced and further supported by purlins. The 16-foot (4.9 m) cupola would then sit on top of the pillar, and around the top of the dome there would be a terrace with a diameter of 27 feet (8.2 m) enclosing an observatory. Building work progressed on this basis, but English and his building team decided not to build the central pillar and to reduce the size of the supporting structures on the roof. The reason for this decision was not recorded, but it alarmed Wilds so much that he resigned from the project. Hollis and English nominally took charge of the work; Hollis had also wanted to keep the supporting pillar and tried to encourage English to reinstate it, or at least to continue with the original scheme of purlins and braces. English refused to do this, and after an argument Hollis also resigned from the project. This left no professional architect or engineer to oversee the work, and English was able to act "much as he pleased for three months without supervision".

== The Anthaeum collapses ==
The immense ribs of iron snapped asunder in ten thousand pieces; and a great part of it, from the height it fell, was buried several feet deep in the earth. The destruction of this great edifice is accounted for only by the immense weight of iron at the top, which when unsupported by the scaffolding, folded in, and forced its way to the ground.

— The Times, reporting the incident the following day

As construction continued through the summer of 1833, temporary scaffolding held up the roof. Henry Phillips decided to ask civil engineer Sir John Rennie for advice on whether this could safely be removed. On 29 August 1833, two days before the Anthaeum's public unveiling, English removed the structure anyway. This may have been because he was angry at the implicit criticism of his workmanship—although Rennie decided not to visit Hove and inspect the structure after hearing Phillips' description of the situation. The lack of any structural support meant that the ribs, which were meant to sit exactly opposite each other, started to bend out of alignment, eventually ending up several degrees askew and pulling the upper circular junction into an ellipse shape. English expected that the pressure could be supported by the terrace and observatory, but this did not happen. Just an hour after he removed the last section of scaffolding on 30 August 1833, the structure started to crack. All of the builders left, and only the head gardener stayed. A second much louder crack forced him to run outside and jump over a wall; the building, which weighed an estimated 400–500 tons, immediately collapsed and embedded itself in the ground. The shock of the disaster made 54-year-old Phillips go blind; he never recovered his sight.

Sources vary on the extent to which the Anthaeum had been glazed when it collapsed. The Times report of 1 September 1833 stated that the work was due to begin on 3 September, but elsewhere it is stated that all or some of the glass was already in place. Thomas Smith of Union Street in The Lanes, Brighton, was named as the glazier; he apparently reclaimed undamaged glass after the collapse and sold it at his workshop. About 2 acres (0.81 ha) (100,000 panes) of glass were said to have been required to cover the structure.

== After the collapse ==
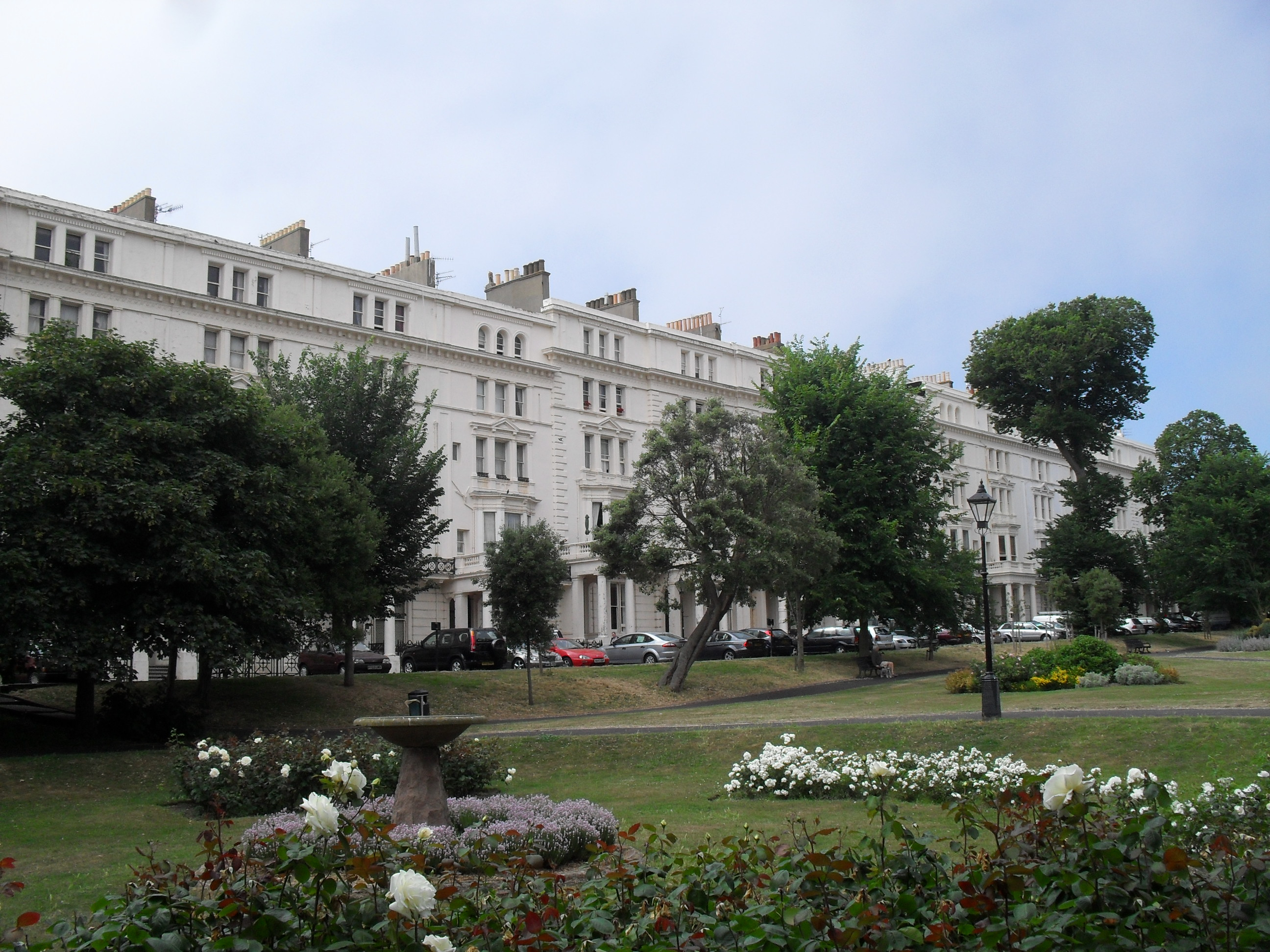
The gardens of Palmeira Square occupy the site of the Anthaeum.

The ruined Anthaeum "enjoyed a certain amount of posthumous celebrity": the tangled remains stayed where they fell until the 1850s and became a tourist attraction. The Times reported that several hundred people had visited on the day after the collapse alone. English and the other builders disappeared and apparently left the country. Sir Isaac Goldsmid was left "distraught" at the disaster, which may have contributed to his loss of enthusiasm for the residential development he was sponsoring at Adelaide Crescent immediately to the south. Work based on Decimus Burton's design was abandoned in 1834 and did not resume until 1850; the scheme was scaled back and resumed by a different architect.

Prominent local architect Charles Busby attended a meeting at Brighton Town Hall some weeks after the collapse, at which proposals to rebuild the Anthaeum were discussed. He agreed to supply a new design, but the cost was estimated at up to £10,000 and the idea was abandoned. In 1850, Joseph Paxton—who was shortly to design The Crystal Palace in London for the Great Exhibition of 1851—visited Hove to inspect the wreckage and ask if the original designs were still available.

After nearly 20 years, the wreckage was eventually cleared in the early 1850s when the Palmeira Square residential development began. The central gardens of the square occupy the site. Work took place between around 1855 and 1865.
