= Palladium (protective image) =

Object on which the safety of a city or nation is said to depend

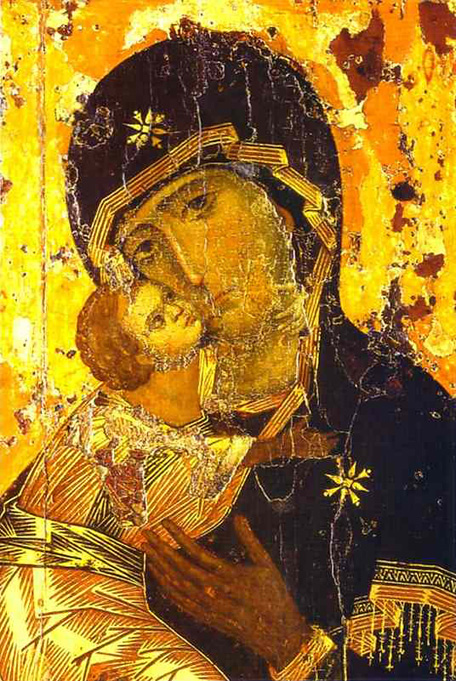
The Theotokos of Vladimir, tempera on panel, 104 x 69 cm, painted c. 1130 in Constantinople, and protectress of Vladimir and later Moscow

A palladium or palladion (plural palladia) is an image or other object of great antiquity on which the safety of a city or nation is said to depend. The word is a generalization from the name of the original Trojan Palladium, a wooden statue (xoanon) of Pallas Athena that Odysseus and Diomedes stole from the citadel of Troy. It was supposedly later taken to the future site of Rome by Aeneas, where it remained until perhaps transferred to Constantinople and was lost after the Empire converted to Christianity.

In English, since around 1600, the word "palladium" has been used figuratively to mean anything believed to provide protection or safety, and in particular in Christian contexts a sacred relic or icon believed to have a protective role in military contexts for a whole city, people or nation. Such beliefs first become prominent in the Eastern Churches in the period after the reign of the Byzantine Emperor Justinian I, and later spread to the Western church. Palladia were processed around the walls of besieged cities and sometimes carried into battle. In this more offensive role they may also be referred to as "vexilla" (singular vexillum, Latin for "battle standard").

== Classical antiquity ==
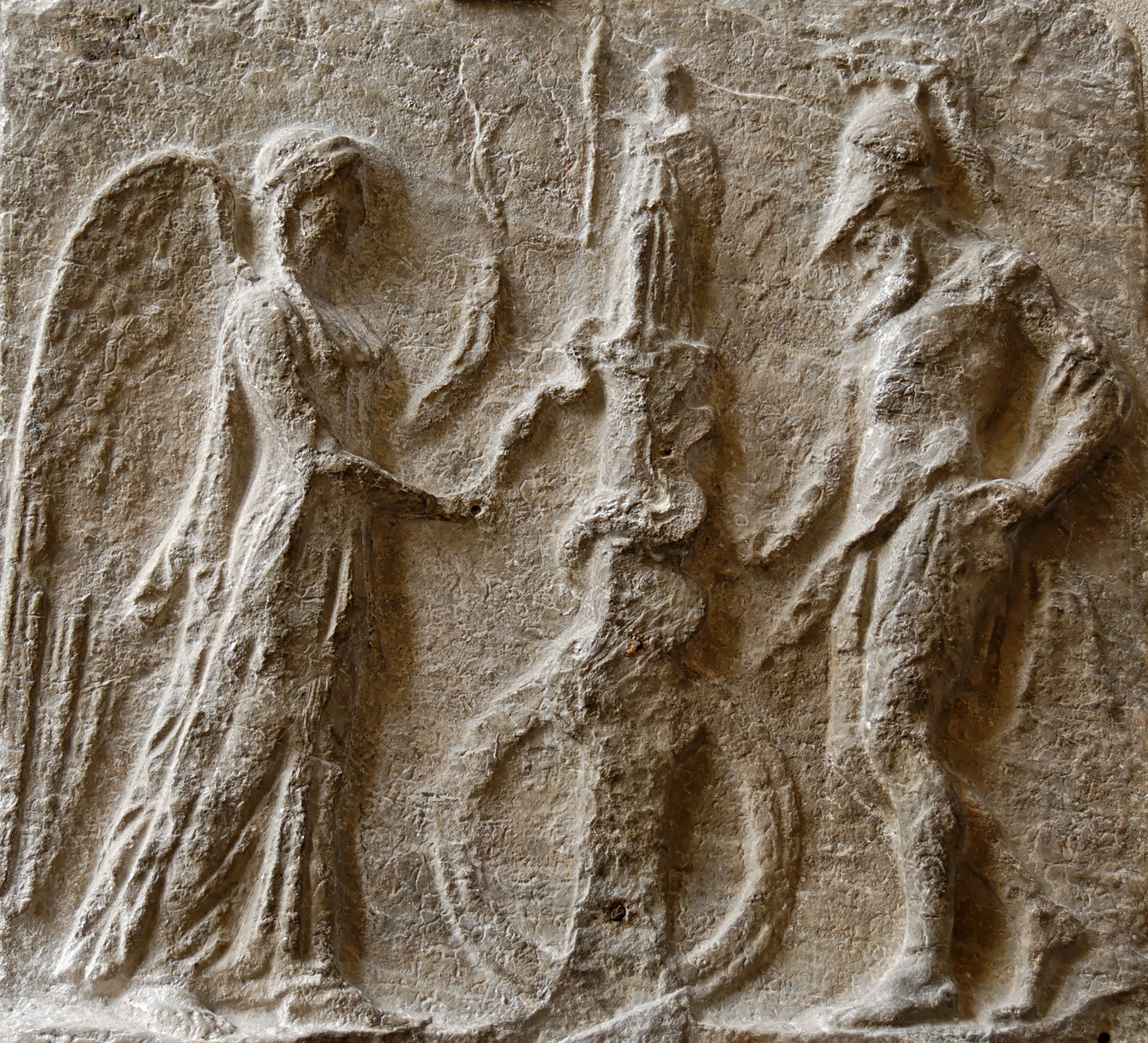
Nike (Victory) offers an egg to a snake entwined around a column surmounted by the Trojan Palladium. (Marble bas relief, Roman copy of the late 1st Century AD. After a neo-Attic original of the Hellenistic era.)

=== Troy and Rome ===
The original Palladion was part of the foundation myths of both Troy and Rome. It was a wooden image of Pallas (whom the Greeks identified with Athena and the Romans with Minerva) said to have fallen from heaven in answer to the prayer of Ilus, the founder of Troy. In the Trojan War the besieging Greeks discovered that they would be unable to take the city while it was protected by it, and so Odysseus and Diomedes stole it from the citadel of Troy before taking the city by the ruse of the Trojan Horse.

According to a later set of myths it was then taken to Rome, where an actual image, unlikely to have been actually of Trojan origin, was kept in the Temple of Vesta in the Roman Forum for centuries, and regarded as one of the pignora imperii, sacred tokens or pledges of Roman rule (imperium). The Roman story is related in Virgil's Aeneid and other works.

=== Athens ===
The goddess Athena was worshipped on the Acropolis of Athens under many names and cults, the most illustrious of which was of the Athena Poliás, "[protectress] of the city". The cult image of the Poliás was a wooden effigy, often referred to as the "xóanon diipetés" (the "carving that fell from heaven"), made of olive wood and housed in the east-facing wing of the Erechtheum temple in the classical era. Considered not a man-made artefact but of divine provenance, it was the holiest image of the goddess and was accorded the highest respect. It was placed under a bronze likeness of a palm tree and a gold lamp burned in front of it.

The centerpiece of the grand feast of the Panathenaea was the replacement of this statue's woolen veil with a newly woven one. It was also carried to the sea by the priestesses and ceremonially washed once a year, in the feast called the Plynteria ("washings"). Its presence was last mentioned by the Church Father Tertullian (Apologeticus 16.6), who, in the late 2nd century AD, described it derisively as being nothing but "a rough stake, a shapeless piece of wood" (Latin original: "[] Pallas Attica [] quae sine effigie rudi palo et informi ligno prostat?"). Earlier descriptions of the statue have not survived.

== Christian palladia ==
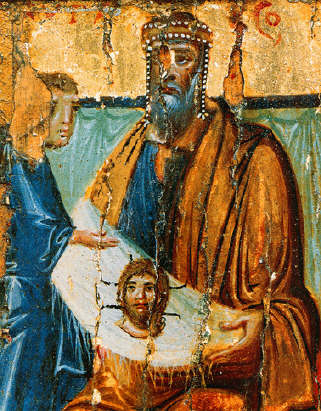
10th-century icon of the Image of Edessa, with King Abgar V of the legend shown as Emperor Constantine VII who brought the image to Constantinople in 944

Around the end of the 6th century the first references to Christian palladia start to appear. The Image of Edessa in Armenian Mesopotamia, or Mandylion, later moved to Constantinople, is one of the first and long the most famous examples. This was later credited with the failure of the Persian siege of Edessa in 544. But the image is not mentioned in the account of Procopius, writing soon after the event, and first appears as the agent of the failure in the history of Evagrius Scholasticus of about 593.

The Byzantine palladia, which first appear in the late 6th century, cannot be said to have had a very successful track record, as apart from Constantinople most major cities in Egypt, Syria and later Anatolia fell to Muslim attacks. Just before the start of the Byzantine Iconoclasm an incident of what might be called a "reverse-palladium" is recorded. According to Iconoclast sources an officer called Constantine, defending Nicaea against an Arab siege in 727, smashed an icon of the Virgin, and this saved the city. The Iconodule sources also record the incident, but say that Constantine was promptly killed, and the city saved by other icons, including the famous series of 318 portraits of participants in the First Council of Nicaea which adorned the hall where the council had met in 325.

- The Image of Camuliana was an icon of Christ which was the earliest important palladium of Constantinople after it reached the city in 574, but seems to have been destroyed in the Byzantine Iconoclasm.
- The Virgin Hodegetria — an ancient Madonna and Child image — was the traditional protectress of Byzantine Constantinople. At times of siege it was paraded along the city walls. At the final fall of the city (1453) it failed to deter the Turks, was pillaged, and disappeared forever.
- The Cathach of St. Columba, a 6th-century Irish psalter, processed round the troops and carried into battle ("Cathach" means "battler") by the O'Donnell Clan, carried round the neck in its cumdach.
- The Salus Populi Romani, an icon of Late Antique provenance, is credited with having protected the city of Rome on numerous occasions, and was recently invoked by Pope Francis during the COVID-19 pandemic. The Pope visited the icon in its location in the Borghese chapel in Santa Maria Maggiore in March 2020, during which he also visited another famous image invoked by the Roman people, the Santissimo Crocifisso, kept in its oratory near San Marcello al Corso.
- The image of Our Lady of Guadalupe has been hailed at times as a protecting image, not just for the people of Mexico where the apparitions related to the image are purported to have taken place in 1531, but also in the United States and other areas of the world where people of Mexican descent have settled. Pope John Paul II entrusted her protection to the unborn in 1999.

== In other cultures ==
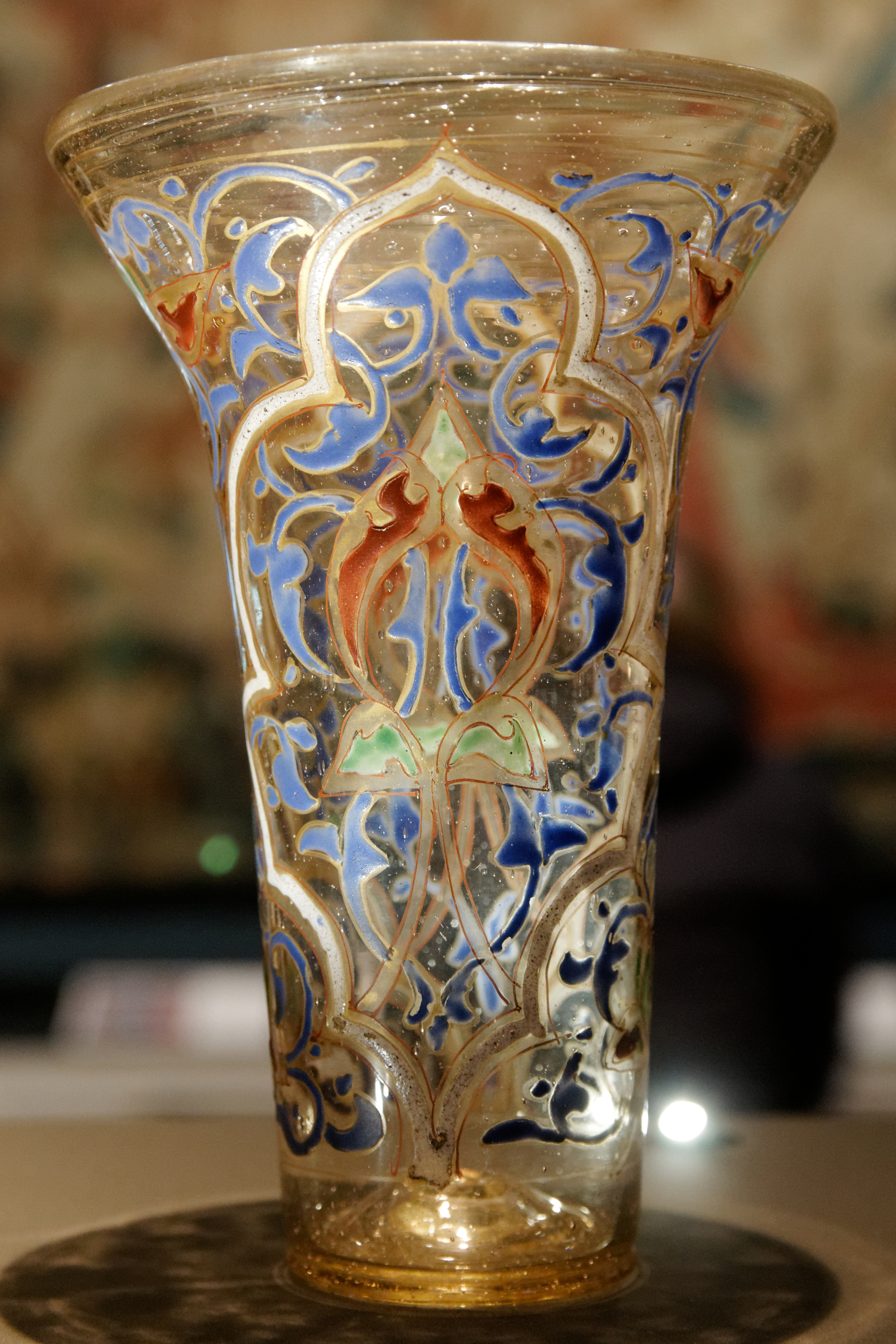
The Luck of Edenhall, 14th-century Islamic glass, a palladium for its English owners

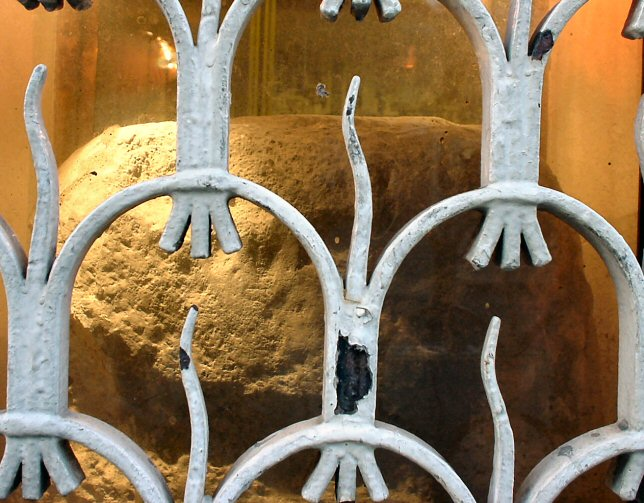
London Stone, seen through its protective grille

- The Heshibi of ancient China.
- The Imperial Regalia of Japan.
- The Emerald Buddha, a palladium (Thai: ขวัญเมือง kwan mueang; colloquially มิ่งเมีอง ming mueang) of the Kingdom of Thailand. Every Thai city and town has a kwan mueang or ming mueang (usually, but not necessarily, an image of Buddha).
- The Phra Bang of Laos.
- In Sri Lanka the Relic of the tooth of the Buddha is often described as a palladium in the rather different sense that control of it represented the legitimacy of the king.
- The Golden Maitreya Buddha in the Wat Preah Keo of the Kingdom of Cambodia.
- In the Khmer Empire, specific lingams associated with monarchs appear to have had a palladium-like role in the devaraja royal cult, although the subject remains controversial among scholars.
- Among many other figurative uses, in the United States, the Constitution has sometimes been referred to as the "Palladium of Liberty" or the "Palladium of the Republic" as guarantor of civil liberties. Thorstein Veblen famously referred to business enterprise as the "Palladium of the Republic". The Christian Palladium was a significant evangelical journal in the United States, appearing between 1832 and 1862, and connected to the Christian Connection and Restoration Movements.
- Palladia in modern folk myth include the Ravens of the Tower of London, probably 19th century in origin, though dubious 17th-century origins have been claimed. These are somewhat typical of folk myth in being one-sided in their effect, in that their removal is said to presage disaster, but their continued presence is not usually held to have significant benefit. The isolated population of Barbary macaques in Gibraltar, whose continued presence is said to ensure British control, are a similar case.
- The Luck of Edenhall is an exceptionally fine and pristine example of 14th century luxury Islamic glass, made in Syria or Egypt, and now in the Victoria and Albert Museum in London. It was in the possession of the Musgrave family of Edenhall, Cumberland, from an unknown but early date, and is recorded in 1791 as having "by tradition" a reputation as a palladium for its owners:

If this cup should break or fall
Farewell the Luck of Edenhall!

The cup has a custom-made 15th-century European leather case and the name is first recorded in a Musgrave will of 1677. A number of other Northern gentry families had a variety of objects called "Lucks", and "Luck of Troy" was an old English term for the Trojan and Roman prototype; the first recorded use of "luck" in this sense is a reference to the Luck of Edenhall.

- Some writers have suggested that the historic London Stone was once regarded as London's palladium. Notably, a pseudonymous contributor to the journal Notes and Queries in 1862 quoted a supposedly ancient proverb to the effect that "So long as the Stone of Brutus is safe, so long shall London flourish". This verse, if it were genuine, would link the Stone to Brutus of Troy, legendary founder of London, as well as confirming its role as a palladium. However, the writer can be identified as Richard Williams Morgan, an eccentric Welsh clergyman who in an earlier book had claimed that the legendary Brutus was a historical figure; London Stone, he wrote, had been the plinth on which the original Trojan Palladium had stood, and was brought to Britain by Brutus and set up as the altar stone of the Temple of Diana in his new capital city of Trinovantum or "New Troy" (London).

This story, and the verse about the "Stone of Brutus", can be found nowhere any earlier than in Morgan's writings. No one before Morgan had called London Stone "The Stone of Brutus", and although the spurious verse is still frequently quoted, there is no evidence that London's safety has ever traditionally been linked to that of London Stone.

== See also ==
- Tutelary deity

== Bibliography ==
- Beard, Charles R. (1934). Luck And Talismans: A Chapter of Popular Superstition. Kessinger Publishing. ISBN 978-1-4179-7648-5. Reprint 2004.
- Beckwith, John (1979). Early Christian and Byzantine art. The Pelican History of Art (2nd ed.). Penguin. ISBN 978-0-300-05295-4.
- Clark, John (2010). "London Stone: Stone of Brutus or fetish stone – making the myth". Folklore. 121: 38–60. doi:10.1080/00155870903482007. S2CID 162476008.
- Kitzinger, Ernst (1954). "The Cult of Images in the Age before Iconoclasm". Dumbarton Oaks Papers. 8: 83–150. doi:10.2307/1291064. ISSN 0070-7546. JSTOR 1291064.
- Mango, Cyril (1977). "Historical Introduction". In Bryer, Anthony; Herrin, Judith (eds.). Iconoclasm: papers given at the ninth Spring Symposium of Byzantine Studies, University of Birmingham, March 1975. Centre for Byzantine Studies. University of Birmingham. pp. 1–6. ISBN 978-0-7044-0226-3.
- Price, S. R. F.; Kearns, Emily, eds. (2003). "Palladium". The Oxford Dictionary of Classical Myth and Religion. ISBN 978-0-19-280288-0.
