= Fairy cup legend =

Folk tales

Fairy cup legends are folk and other tales usually relating to the theft of a "fairy cup", sometimes in the form of a drinking horn, usually from a "fairy mound" (i.e. from a tumulus). The legends are found in northwestern Europe.

== Overview ==
Fairy cup legends are classified under Reidar Thoralf Christiansen's scheme as migratory type 6045. (Note: A migratory type is one that occurs in several places) Stories of this type originate from England, Germany, Norway, Sweden, Denmark, the Isle of Man, and Scotland.

In many versions of the tale the vessel is in the shape of the horn; (Note: The Oldenburg Horn; The Öiestad Horn; The Fairy Horn) usually the vessel is gold, or of some other precious material. Tales often begin with a hole in the ground or similar opening up mysteriously, revealing "little people" living underground. (Note: The Stolen Cup; Church Cup (Ragebøl); The Trolls Celebrate Christmas; The Fairy Banquet; The Silver Cup) In some versions the fairy person offers a drink from the cup, which the protagonist refuses or discards - with the vessel's discarded liquid often acting corrosively. (Note: The Oldenburg Horn; Church Cup (Viöl); Church Cup (Ragebøl); The Altar Cup in Aagerup; Svend Fælling and the Elle-Maid; The Öiestad Horn; The Fairy Banquet; The Fairy Cup of Kirk Malew; The Silver Cup) Usually the vessel is stolen by the human protagonist of the tale, them then being consumed by fear and often chased by angry supernatural beings (Note: The Oldenburg Horn; The Stolen Cup; Church Cup (Viöl); Church Cup (Ragebøl); The Altar Cup in Aagerup; The Öiestad Horn; The Trolls Celebrate Christmas; The Fairy Banquet; The Silver Cup) – the vessel is sometimes recorded as ending up in the possession of a member of the nobility (Note: The Oldenburg Horn; The Trolls Celebrate Christmas; The Fairy Banquet; The Fairy Horn) or the church. (Note: Church Cup (Viöl); Church Cup (Ragebøl); Church Cup (Hjordkær); The Altar Cup in Aagerup; Origin of the Noble Name of Trolle; The Fairy Cup of Kirk Malew; The Silver Cup)

== Versions ==
except where noted, from (Ashliman 2009)

- The Oldenburg Horn, Oldenburg, Lower-Saxony, Germany. (German: "Das Oldenburger Horn" or "Die Nymphe des Osenbergs") - an "Oldenborg Horn" exists, but was made c. 1465.
- The Stolen Cup, Tensbüttel-Röst, Schleswig-Holstein, Germany
- 'Church Cup' tales, recorded at Viöl, Schleswig-Holstein; at Ragebøl, Denmark; and at Hjordkær, Denmark
- The Altar Cup in Aagerup, Zealand, Denmark. Similar tale also recorded at Vigersted, Zealand
- Svend Fælling and the Elle-Maid, Framley, Denmark - in this tale the protagonist returns the cup for supernatural strength, but is then bothered by the 'fairy' as a result of it.
- The Öiestad Horn, Øyestad, Norway - the horn is in the possession of the Aust-Agder museum.
- The Trolls Celebrate Christmas, Ljungby, Sweden. (A pipe was also offered and stolen) The items are now in the possession of Trolle-Ljungby Castle
- Origin of the Noble Name of Trolle, Småland, Sweden.
- The Fairy Banquet, East Yorkshire, England. Recorded in the 12th-century Historia rerum Anglicarum. This tale is associated with the tumulus called Willy Howe.
- The Fairy Horn, Gloucester, England. Recorded in the 13th-century Otia Imperialia.
  - The Story of the Fairy Horn, nr. Gloucester, England. Version similar to The Fairy Horn.
- The Fairy Cup of Kirk Malew, Isle of Man. In this version a person attends a fairy feast but does not drink from the fairy cup - at morning he is left alone with the cup.
- The Silver Cup, Isle of Man. The protagonist follows fairy folk who had been stealing milk from his cows to their fairy hill. After attending their feast he steals the cup as recompense for his cows.
- (Westwood & Kingshill 2009) "The Story of Luran", West Highlands, Scotland. Standard form of tale concerning a butler boy named Luran - in it the cup ends in the possession of Mingarry Castle until lost at sea. Similar tales also existed for Dunvegan Castle (see Dunvegan Cup), and at Raasay. Other folktales exist involving Luran.

== Archaeology ==
Numerous types of vessel (usually pottery) are found associated with British tumulus burials, including items that were either cremation containers, or assumed to be containers for food offerings for the afterlife, or simply treasures or personal effects. Of these some have been identified as 'drinking cups', usual associated with non-cremated interments. Roughly similar cups have been found in Northern Germany, Denmark, and Holland.

The form of these cups differs from those found in Roman or Anglo-Saxon burials in Britain. The pottery is hand made, not made on a wheel, and is usually well decorated. The usual form in Britain is a well decorated 'beaker' shape, though cups with handles are also known from the Yorkshire Wolds, and elsewhere. (Greenwell 1877) considered that the generally detailed decoration made them impracticable for general daily use, and that they were made specifically for burial with the dead.

Non pottery cups include one made of shale, found near Honiton, an amber cup from near Hove (the Hove amber cup), and the Rillaton gold cup.

== Other 'Fairy Cup' variants ==
(Ashliman 2009) also gives the story of The Rillaton Gold Cup as being of this type, though the tale is different being of an inexhaustible cup offered by a druid. This tale is associated with Rillaton Barrow. The Trowie "Pig", from Scotland, also tells of an inexhaustible jug.

There is a Scottish folktale from the 17th century of a man who sees a whirlwind in a field and hears voices saying "Horse and Hattock" - he repeats the phrase and is swept up by the wind and wakes up the next day in the King of France's cellar with a silver cup in his hand.

A fairy origin legend has also been given to the glass known as the Luck of Edenhall, a 14th-century drinking glass originating in the Middle East. In the legend, which may have been invented in the 18th century, the cup was obtained when fairies were interrupted drinking at a well at Eden Hall (Edenhall), and left the glass behind.

== See also ==
- Holy Grail
