= Hove amber cup =

Bronze Age cup

Coordinates: 50.8258°N 0.1636°W

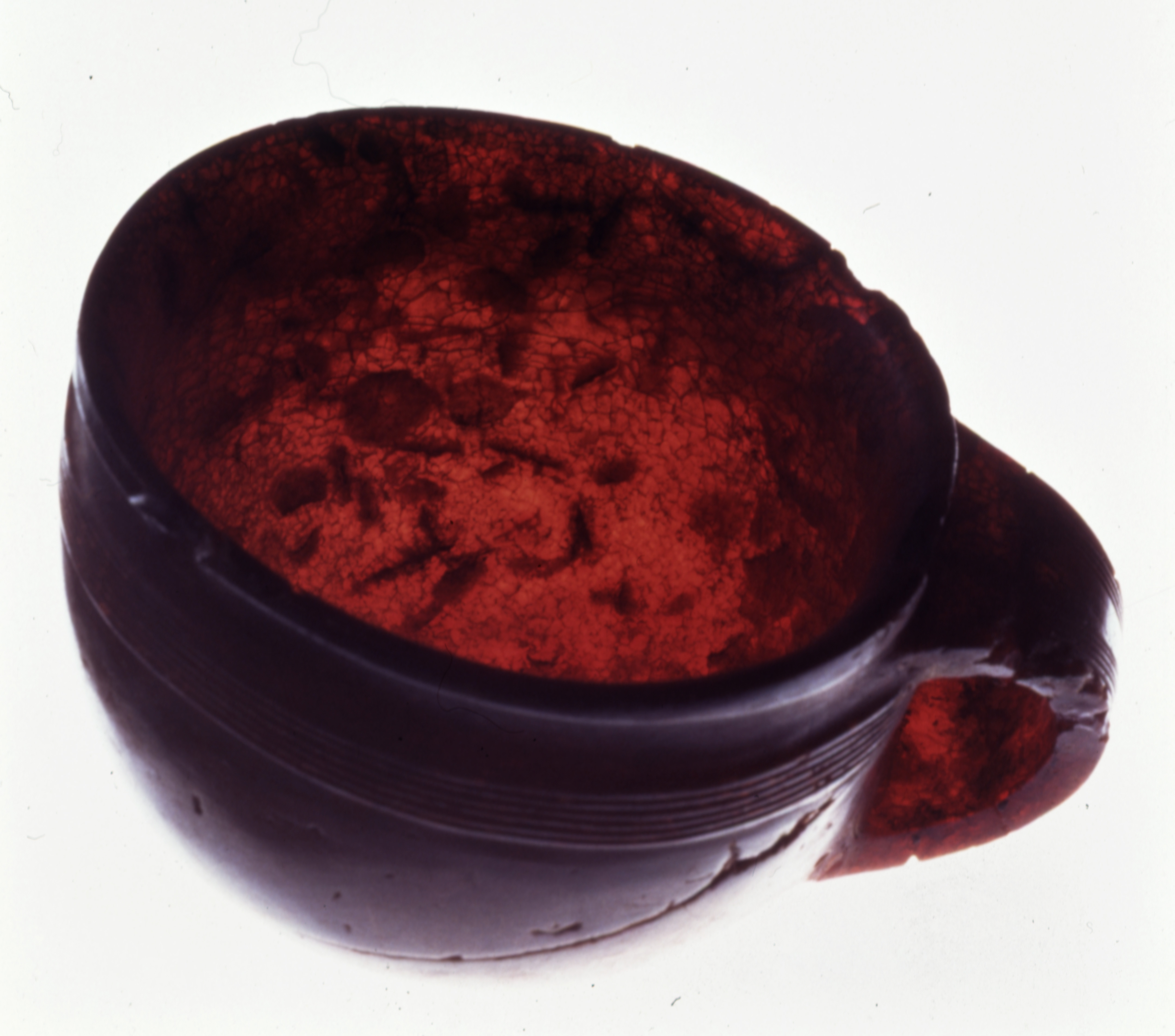
- Material: Amber
- Created: c. 1650 BC
- Discovered: 1856; Hove, England, United Kingdom
- Present location: Brighton Museum and Art Gallery, England, United Kingdom

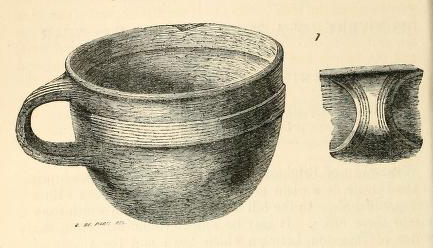
Hove amber cup, from original description in 1857

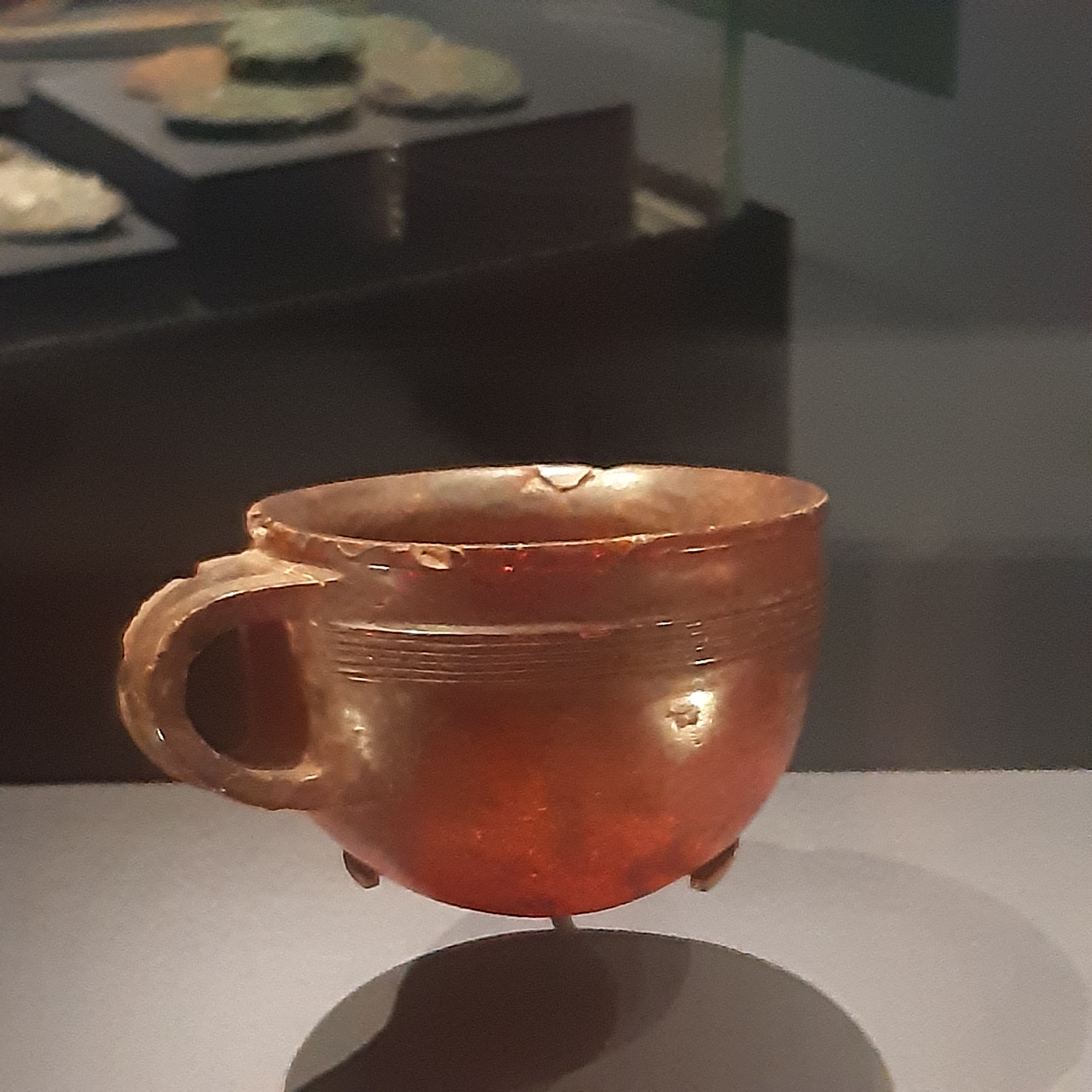
Hove amber cup on display in the British Museum Stonehenge exhibition

The Hove amber cup is a Bronze Age cup that was discovered in a great round barrow mound that was crudely excavated in 1856 in Hove, East Sussex, England, and is now in the Brighton Museum and Art Gallery. It was found during the construction of Palmeira Square. The barrow was of exceptional size and quality, suggesting a date in the mid-Bronze Age. The Hove amber cup is one of only two found in Britain; the other was in Dorset. However, the two are not of the same style of craftsmanship.

Dated to c. 1750-1550 BC, the amber cup was found in a Wessex culture grave in a coffin made from a treetrunk. Also in the coffin were a skeleton, a Camerton (Wessex culture) type dagger, a whetstone and a small axe.

It has been associated with a small group of other "unstable" cups with round bottoms, made of precious materials and found in northwestern Europe. Most are in gold, but also silver, amber and shale. The Ringlemere Cup and Rillaton Cup are the two British gold cups. The amber would have come from the Baltic region, and the group suggest early trade links between Britain and Europe.

== Construction ==
The cup is made from a single piece of amber, and this suggests trading links between this part of Britain and the Baltic regions where such amber was extracted.

== Original account ==
According to the original description by Barclay Philips,

In the earth with which the coffin was filled were numerous small fragments of carious bone, apparently charred, some of which were picked out; and about the centre, as if, said one of the men, they had rested on the breast of the body interred, were found the following curious relics: —

An Amber Cup, hemispherical in shape, rather deep in proportion to its width, with a "lip" or "nick," and ornamented merely with a band of fine lines running round the outside, about half an inch from the top. There is one handle, large enough for the insertion of a finger, ornamented with a fillet on each side of the surface, which is flat, similar to that on the cup itself. From the fact of the rim not being perfectly round, and the band before mentioned not passing over the space within the handle, and its being marked off with a line at each end, seemingly cut across, we may conjecture it to have been made and carved by hand. There are two small chips in the rim.

That on the left of the handle is fresh, and was caused by the man who found the cup accidentally striking it, as he told me, with his spade, when he first came upon it; that on the right is not so large, but is ancient, as is shown by its appearance. The cup is perfectly smooth inside and out, excepting where the earth in which it was buried still adheres to the surface; but since its exhumation the amber has cracked slightly in every part. On the cup being lifted by the handle, this broke into two pieces, having received a blow from the workman's spade, but fortunately the fragments fit very exactly, and I have therefore easily repaired it.

The following are the dimensions of the cup, which I have carefully measured, expressed in inches and decimal parts: —
External diameter, 3.5 inches; internal, 3.35.
Height, 2.5; depth, 2.4.
Internal diameter at and below band, 3'; width of lip, '125.
Distance of band from upper rim of lip, .5; width of band of six fillets, .3.
Width of handle at upper and lower end, 1.5 in centre,"6.
Thickness of handle, '2; depth of handle from upper surface of insertion between lip and fillet to surface below, 1'4.
Projection of handle from surface of cup to outer surface of handle, .85; average thickness of cup, .2.

According to these measurements I find, by calculation, that the capacity of the cup is a little more than half a pint.
