= St Cuthbert's Church, Edenhall =

Coordinates: 54.6816°N 2.6700°W

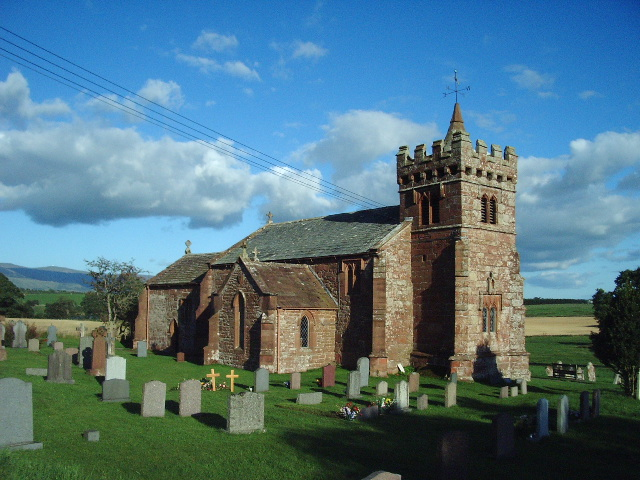
- St Cuthbert's Church, Edenhall, from the northwest

- Location in Cumbria
- OS grid reference: NY 569 321
- Location: Edenhall, Cumbria
- Country: England
- Denomination: Anglican
- Website: St Cuthbert, Edenhall

History
- Status: Parish church
- Dedication: Saint Cuthbert

Architecture
- Functional status: Active
- Heritage designation: Grade I
- Designated: 27 December 1967
- Architectural type: Church
- Style: Norman, Gothic, Gothic Revival
- Groundbreaking: 12th century
- Completed: 1834

Specifications
- Materials: Sandstone, slate roofs

Administration
- Diocese: Carlisle
- Archdeaconry: Carlisle
- Deanery: Penrith
- Parish: Edenhall

St Cuthbert's Church is located near the village of Edenhall, Cumbria, England. It is an active Anglican parish church in the deanery of Penrith, the archdeaconry of Carlisle, and the diocese of Carlisle. Its benefice has been united with those of seven local parishes to form the Cross Fell Group of churches. The church is recorded in the National Heritage List for England as a designated Grade I listed building. It stands to the southeast of the village, and is surrounded by parkland.

== History ==
The chancel and nave date from the 12th century; the chancel was lengthened in the 13th century. The tower was added in the middle of the 15th century. In 1834 the porch and vestry were added; these are attributed to the Kendal architect George Webster.

== Architecture ==
St Cuthbert's is constructed in sandstone rubble with green slate roofs. Its plan consists of a three-bay nave with a south porch and a north vestry, a two-bay chancel, and a west tower. The tower is in two stages. It has a two-light west window incorporating coats of arms, two-light bell openings, a battlemented parapet, and a short spire with a weathervane. A series of holes around the base of the parapet form a type of machicolation for defensive purposes. In the south wall of the nave are a 19th-century round-headed doorway, and a two-light and a three-light window. Incorporated in the fabric of the porch are two fragments of a medieval graveslab. In the north wall of the nave are a thin blocked Norman window, and a two-light window with Decorated tracery. In the south wall of the chancel are a blocked priest's door, a lancet window, and two two-light windows. The east window has three lights.

Inside the church is a west gallery with panels containing coats of arms. The font is medieval. In the windows is a variety of stained glass including medieval fragments, 17th-century roundels, and glass from the 19th century. The windows also incorporate coats of arms. The oldest monument in the church is a brass dated 1468. A series of wall tablets date from the 17th to the 19th century.

== External features ==
To the north of the church is a roadside sandstone cross. It consists of a medieval stepped plinth with a 19th-century shaft and wheel-head cross. The structure has been listed at Grade II, and it is a scheduled monument.

== See also ==
- Grade I listed churches in Cumbria
- Grade I listed buildings in Cumbria
- Listed buildings in Langwathby
