= Mary Powley =

- Mary Powley in late 1850s
- Born: Langwathby, Cumbria
- Baptised: bapt. 1811
- Died: 23 December 1882; Langwathby, Cumbria
- Occupations: antiquarian and poet

Mary Powley (bapt. 1811 – 23 December 1882) was a British antiquary and poet in Cumbria. She was expert in dialect and contributed significantly to understanding of the history of the Norse in this region.

== Early life ==
Powley was born in Langwathby, England. She never married. Her father died in 1827 and she was given an annuity which gave her financial independence.

== Career ==
Mary Powley's only book, the poetry collection Echoes of Old Cumberland (1875) comprises poems of family affection, of local rural activity past and present, poems in Cumbrian dialect and poems in translation, these last principally from the Danish. Many of the poems are glossed by extensive footnotes that confirm the passion of her antiquarian interests.

Compact and sharp coverage of that area of Powley’s contributions and achievement can be found in The Oxford Dictionary of National Biography (2025), where she is identified as “a particularly talented, dedicated and perceptive historian of local life and custom”. She was the first woman to contribute a Transaction (formal annual lecture) to the Cumberland and Westmorland Antiquarian and Archaeological Society (CWAAS). In "A Plea for the Old Names", one of six such lectures, she appeals, “It is for the names of lonely and desert places, and of the common fields that I plead. They are often of extreme antiquity; names given before enclosures and title deeds; but they are often intimately connected with our dialect…..” She also wrote extensively for the academic journal Notes and Queries. Her contributions to the English Dialect Society only fully emerged after her death, when that society’s work came to fruition.

Extensive further coverage of Mary’s life by a local study group is available in Cumbria County Council Archives.

== Death ==
In later years Mary was much involved in care of her parents, also of an uncle, who retired from a successful career as a mercer in London, building himself a new house next to the family home. Much debilitated in old age but to the end well supported by loyal servants, Mary died there in 1882, and she was buried in the parish church of St Peters.
