= Listed buildings in Langwathby =

Langwathby is a civil parish in Westmorland and Furness, Cumbria, England. It contains 27 listed buildings that are recorded in the National Heritage List for England. Of these, one is listed at Grade I, the highest of the three grades, one is at Grade II*, the middle grade, and the others are at Grade II, the lowest grade. The parish contains the villages of Langwathby and Edenhall and the surrounding countryside. In the earlier part of the 20th century the largest building in the parish was Eden Hall, but this was demolished in 1934. A number of listed buildings are associated with Eden Hall, including The Courtyard, West Lodge, and related structures. Most of the other listed buildings are houses and associated structures, farmhouses and farm buildings. The other listed buildings include churches, a medieval roadside cross, a public house, a railway viaduct, a war memorial, and a telephone kiosk.

== Key ==
Grade	Criteria
I	Buildings of exceptional interest, sometimes considered to be internationally important
II*	Particularly important buildings of more than special interest
II	Buildings of national importance and special interest

== Buildings ==
Name and location	Photograph	Date	Notes	Grade
St Cuthbert's Church; 54.68164°N 2.66993°W		12th century	The church was altered and extended during the following centuries, including adding the tower in the 15th century, and the vestry and porch in 1834. The church is built in sandstone with buttresses, and has a roof of green slate with coped gables and cross finials. It consists of a nave with a south porch, a chancel with a north vestry and a west tower. The tower has two stages, a west doorway, a battlemented parapet, and a short spire with a weathervane. Incorporated into the south wall of the porch are medieval graveslabs.	I
Roadside cross 54.68328°N 2.67206°W		Medieval	A sandstone roadside cross with a medieval base and a 19th-century shaft. There is a stepped plinth on which is a tapering shaft carrying a wheel-head cross. The cross is also a Scheduled Monument.	II
St Peter's Church; 54.69674°N 2.67015°W	—	13th century	The church was altered in the 15th century, it was partly rebuilt in 1718, and the porch was added in 1836. It is in sandstone, the rebuilt part is on a chamfered plinth, with quoins, an eaves cornice, and a green slate roof with coped gables. The church consists of a nave with a west porch and vestry, a north aisle, and a chancel. On the west gable is a twin bellcote. Along the south side are round-headed windows, and in the west and east walls are lancet windows.	II*
Tea Rose Cottage and Corner Cottage; 54.68439°N 2.67458°W	—	1707	A pair of rendered houses with sandstone quoins, moulded string courses, and a sandstone slate roof with coped gables. Both houses have two storeys, two bays, and sash windows in stone surrounds. The doorway to Tea Rose Cottage on the left has a bolection architrave, a pulvinated frieze, a cornice, and an initialled and dated panel. The house on the right, Corner Cottage, has a doorway with a quoined surround. At the rear are a gabled stair wing flanked by outshuts.	II
Eden Bank and Eden Bank Cottage; 54.69487°N 2.66933°W	—	Early 18th century	A house and adjoining cottage, they are rendered and have a green slate roof. They have two storeys and each dwelling has two bays. The house has casement windows with the former mullions removed. The doorway of the cottage has a stone surround and a dated and inscribed lintel, which is probably re-used, and the windows are mullioned. At the rear are windows with chamfered surrounds.	II
Ivy Cottage; 54.68484°N 2.67662°W	—	Early 18th century	A pair of sandstone houses on a boulder plinth, with quoins, an eaves cornice and a sandstone slate roof with coped gables. There are two storeys and a total of six bays. The doorways and sash windows have stone surrounds.	II
The Limes and Lilac Cottage; 54.68478°N 2.67466°W	—	Early 18th century	A house and former stables, now two dwellings, they are in sandstone and have a sandstone slate roof. There are two storeys, and each house has four bays. The doorway has a stone surround, and to the right of it is a mullioned window and a fire window. The other windows are sashes; in the original house they have chamfered surrounds, and in the former stables they have sandstone surrounds.	II
The Luham; 54.69169°N 2.69103°W	—	Early 18th century (probable)	A sandstone farmhouse with quoins and a green slate roof. There are three storeys and two bays in a double-depth plan, and a lower two-storey three-bay extension. The doorway in the original part has a pediment, and most of the windows are mullioned, with one sash window.	II
Shepherd's Inn; 54.69541°N 2.66987°W		Early 18th century	Originally two houses, one dating from the late 18th century, combined to form a public house that is stuccoed with a Welsh slate roof. The right former house has two storeys and two bays, and the left house is slightly higher with two storeys and three bays. The doorway has a stone surround, and the windows are a mix of sashes and casements.	II
The White House; 54.69584°N 2.67094°W	—	1737	A roughcast farmhouse with quoins, a sandstone eaves cornice, and a roof of grey slate with some sandstone slate, and with coped gables. There are two storeys, three bays, and a central doorway with a stone surround. The windows on the front are sashes in stone surrounds, and at the rear are horizontally-sliding sashes and mullioned windows.	II
High Farmhouse and former stables 54.69475°N 2.66819°W	—	Mid 18th century	The farmhouse and former stables are in sandstone with quoins, an eaves cornice, and a roof of green slate with coped gables. There are two storeys, the house has four bays, with a single-bay former stable to the left. The doorway has a stone surround and a lintel with a panel. The windows in the house are sashes in chamfered stone surrounds, and in the former stables are a casement window and a blocked loft doorway.	II
Barn, High Farm; 54.69458°N 2.66811°W	—	Mid 18th century	The barn is in sandstone with a sandstone slate roof. There is one storey, three bays, a lean-to extension at the left, and another extension at the rear. In the centre is a segmental-arched cart entrance, to the left is a casement window, to the right external steps lead to a loft door, and there are other doorways.	II
The Old Vicarage; 54.68525°N 2.67506°W	—	Mid 18th century	The vicarage, later a private house, is rendered with sandstone dressings and a sandstone slate roof. There are two storeys, three central bays, and flanking single-bay gabled wings. In the middle part, the ground floor projects forward and contains a central door with a fanlight, flanked by three-light windows. In the upper floor are similar windows, and a sash window. There are sash windows in the wings, and on the left side in the upper floor are mullioned windows.	II
The Pheasantries; 54.67677°N 2.68543°W	—	Mid 18th century (probable)	This originated as a schoolhouse and classroom, it was extensively altered in the 19th century, and later used as a house. It is in sandstone with quoins, a string course, and a green slate roof with coped gables. The house has 2 1/2 storeys, three bays and a lower two-bay extension. On the front is a gabled Tudor-style porch with shaped bargeboards. The windows are mullioned and there are also gabled dormers. On the extension is a truncated bellcote, and at the rear is a porch and windows with chamfered surrounds.	II
Edenhall Farmhouse; 54.68416°N 2.67587°W	—	1770	A sandstone farmhouse with quoins and a green slate roof. There are two storeys, three bays and a double depth plan. In the centre is a doorway with a quoined surround and a keyed lintel. Above it is a window with an alternate block surround, a keyed lintel and a pediment. This is flanked by two-storey canted bay windows with hipped roofs.	II
Powley Farmhouse; 54.69558°N 2.66919°W	—	Late 18th century	The farmhouse was extended in the early 19th century. It is stuccoed, with quoins and a green slate roof. There are two storeys and two bays, and a recessed two-storey single-bay extension to the left. The doorway has an architrave, a pulvinated frieze, and a pediment, and the windows are sash windows in stone surrounds.	II
Udford; 54.66760°N 2.66187°W	—	Late 18th or early 19th century	A rendered farmhouse with sandstone quoins and a sandstone slate roof. There are two storeys and three bays, a lower two-bay extension at the left, and a rear two-bay extension. The doorway and the sash windows have stone surrounds.	II
West Lodge; 54.67740°N 2.68803°W	—	1830s	The lodge was provided for Eden Hall (now demolished) and designed by George Webster. It is in calciferous sandstone with a lead roof, one storey, and two bays in a cruciform plan. On the front is a tetrastyle Greek Doric porch with fluted columns and a pediment. Step lead up to the doorway that has an architrave and a hood on consoles. On the sides are casement windows in architraves, and in the centres are gable pediments with pilasters.	II
Gate piers and wall south-east of West Lodge; 54.67707°N 2.68805°W	—	1830s	The piers and walls adjoining the main gateway to Eden Hall (now demolished) were designed by George Webster. They are in calciferous sandstone ashlar. There are two piers with alternate-rusticated blocks and shaped caps, and flanking high walls ending in plain piers.	II
Gate piers and wall west of West Lodge; 54.67732°N 2.68841°W	—	1830s	The piers and walls adjoining the main gateway to Eden Hall (now demolished) were designed by George Webster. They are in calciferous sandstone ashlar. There are two piers with alternate-rusticated blocks and shaped caps, and flanking high walls ending in plain piers.	II
Gate piers and walls for Eden Hall; 54.67733°N 2.68816°W	—	1830s	The piers and walls are at the entrance to the drive to Eden Hall (now demolished) and were designed by George Webster. They are in calciferous sandstone ashlar. The piers are square on chamfered plinths, and have angle pilasters. The central piers are surmounted by heraldic emblems. There are low flanking walls rusticated wall with flat coping, they have interval piers, and form a U-shaped plan with end piers.	II
The Court Yard; 54.68342°N 2.67708°W	—	1841	These were designed as stables and coach houses for Eden Hall (now demolished) by Robert Smirke, and have since been partly converted for domestic occupation. They are in sandstone with string courses and pilasters, and have green slate roofs, and are in two storeys. The buildings form four ranges around a courtyard, and at the entrance is a segmental-headed archway over which is an octagonal domed cupola with clock faces on four sides. Some of the windows are sashes, and others are casements.	II
Walls and gateways, The Court Yard; 54.68382°N 2.67781°W	—	1841 (probable)	The walls and gateways were designed by Robert Smirke, and are in sandstone. There are three gateways flanked by square rusticated piers with pyramidal caps. Between the gateways are high walls with pilasters. Approaching each gateway is a pier with a ball finial joined to the gate pier by a serpentine wall.	II
Barn and stables, The Court Yard; 54.68385°N 2.67725°W	—	Mid 19th century	The barn and stables are in sandstone and have green slate roofs, hipped on the stables. The barn forms a long range, with the single-storey six-bay stables at right angles. The barn contains a large central segmental-headed cart entrance and ventilation slits. The stables have plank doors, and on the roof are vented cupolas.	II
Little Salkeld Viaduct; 54.71031°N 2.67454°W		1875	The viaduct was built by the Midland Railway for the Settle-Carlisle line, to carry the railway over the valley of Briggle Beck. It is in sandstone with brick soffits to the arches, and it has seven spans of 45 feet (14 m). The viaduct is carried on tapering piers, and has imposts, a continuous band, and a solid parapet.	II
Edenhall War Memorial; 54.68506°N 2.67575°W		1920	The war memorial stands in a roadside enclosure. It is in limestone, and consists of a wheel-head cross on a tapering shaft, a tapering four-sided plinth, and a two-stepped square base, in all about 3 metres (9.8 ft) high. On the front of the cross-head is Celtic knotwork, and on the base of the shaft and the plinth are an inscription and the names of those lost in the First World War. At the front of the enclosure are two cast iron posts linked by chains, and flanked by piers with plaques inscribed with the names of those who served and returned.	II
Telephone kiosk 54.69522°N 2.66893°W	—	1935	A K6 type telephone kiosk, designed by Giles Gilbert Scott. Constructed in cast iron with a square plan and a dome, it has three unperforated crowns in the top panels.	II
