= Langwathby =

Village and civil parish in Cumbria, England

Coordinates: 54.695938°N 2.670071°W

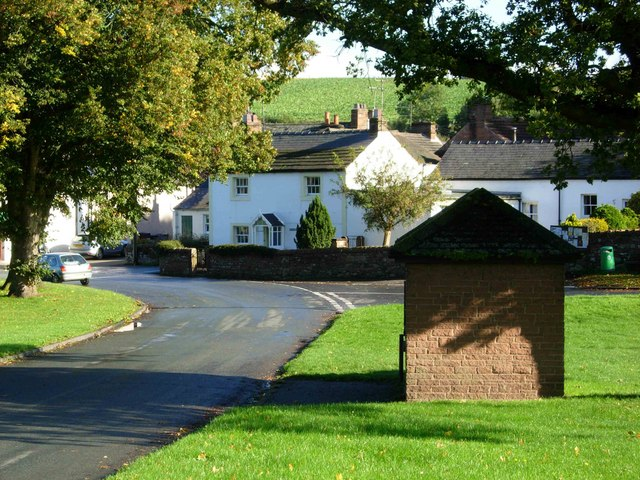
- Village green

- Location in the former Eden District Cumbria Location within Cumbria
- Population: 866 (2011)
- OS grid reference: NY569336
- Civil parish: Langwathby
- Unitary authority: Westmorland and Furness
- Ceremonial county: Cumbria
- Region: North West
- Country: England
- Sovereign state: United Kingdom
- Post town: PENRITH
- Postcode district: CA10, CA11
- Dialling code: 01768
- Police: Cumbria
- Fire: Cumbria
- Ambulance: North West
- UK Parliament: Penrith and Solway

Langwathby is a village and civil parish in northern Cumbria, and in the historic English county of Cumberland, about 5 miles (8 km) north east of Penrith on the A686 road. The village lies on the east bank of the River Eden. At the 2001 census the parish had a population of 748, increasing to 866 at the 2011 Census.

The village is centred on a large village green next to which stands St Peter's church, the village pub, the shop & post office, and the village hall. There is a primary school on the road to Little Salkeld and there are two garages.

Langwathby is the base of the 'Pride of Cumbria', one of the helicopters run by the Great North Air Ambulance Service

== Toponymy ==
'Langwathby' can be translated as 'long' ('lang'), 'ford' ('wath', Old Norse 'vað'), 'village' (Old English 'bȳ', Old Norse 'býr'), referring to the fording of the River Eden which runs along the edge of the village. It is sometimes locally called Langanby.

== History ==
In the 1600s, Langwathby moor was the site of a major racecourse. The last race was held in 1699.

The Settle to Carlisle Railway has a railway station in the village, built in 1876. The station building is now a cafe.

The parish includes the nearby village of Edenhall which was a separate parish until 1934.

The ford which gave the village its name was replaced by a three-arched sandstone toll bridge, which was washed away in 1968. A metal girder bridge was erected as a “temporary” replacement.

At Langwathby Hall was the visitor attraction and working ostrich farm called Eden Ostrich World, which closed in 2012.

== Governance ==
An electoral ward in the same name exists. This ward stretches north east to Gamblesby and south to Edenhall with a total population taken at the 2011 Census of 1,562.

== People ==
The antiquary and poet Mary Powley was baptised here in 1811 and she died and was buried here in 1882.

== Industry ==
At Langwathby there is a chicken processing factory and an animal feed mill.

At Barbary Plains just outside Edenhall, there was formerly a cement block works formerly owned by Hanson plc and later by RMC Group, part of Cemex. The site is now a depot and head office for a haulage company.

== See also ==
- Listed buildings in Langwathby
