= Ringlemere Cup =

Bronze Age vessel

Coordinates: 51.2647°N 1.2865°E

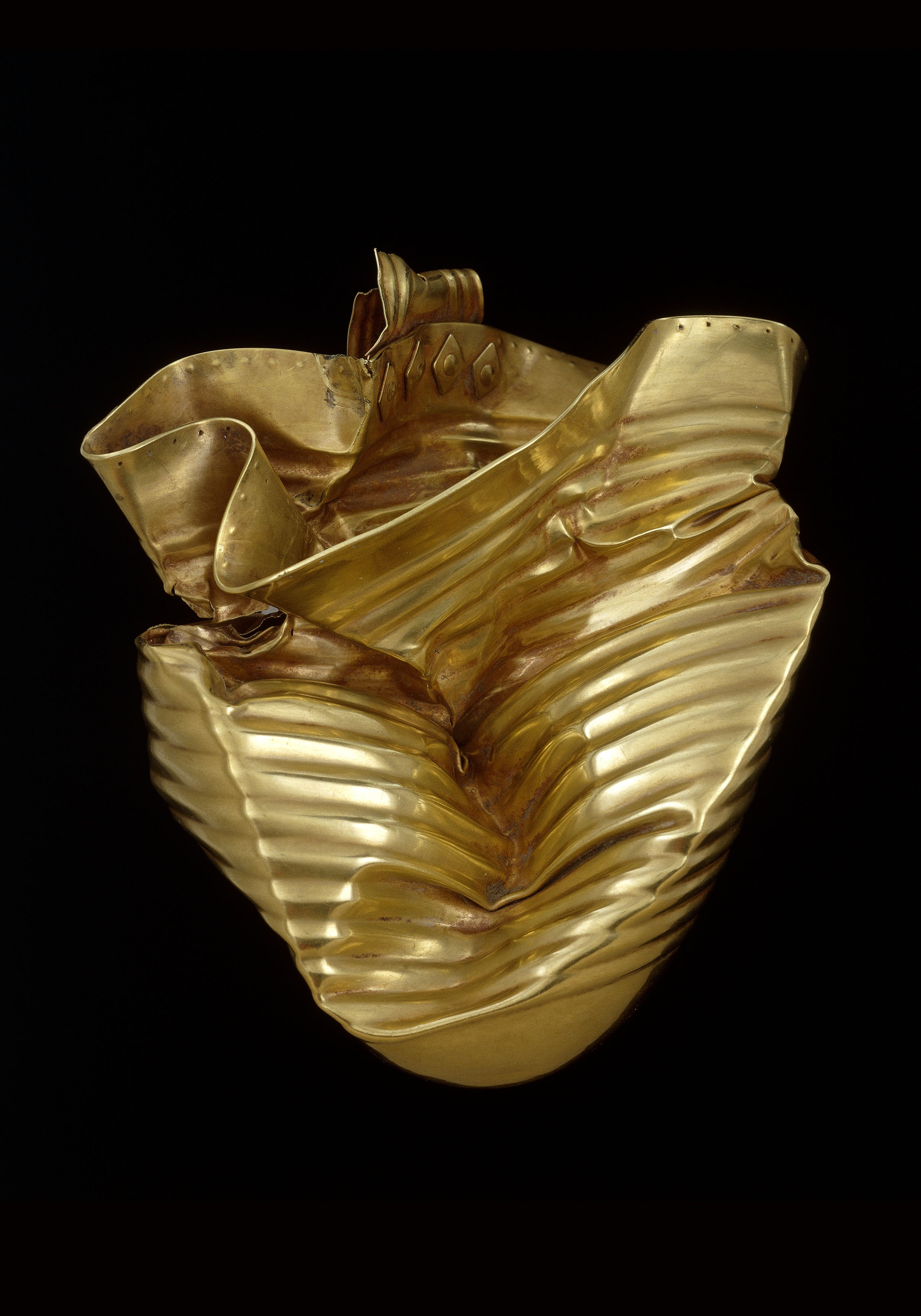
- Material: Gold
- Height: 14 cm (original)
- Created: c. 1600 BC
- Discovered: 4 November 2001; England, United Kingdom
- Discovered by: Cliff Bradshaw
- Present location: British Museum, England, United Kingdom

The Ringlemere Gold Cup is a Bronze Age vessel found in the Ringlemere barrow near Sandwich in the English county of Kent in 2001. Its discovery marked the beginning of research into and excavation of ring marks in the surrounding soil and what was later termed the Ringlemere Barrow. This find inspired further research by the British Museum and others into the connection between the Ringlemere Cup and others like it, published as a book in 2006.

It is thought that the cup was not a grave good, but a votive offering independent of any inhumation, which was placed at the centre of the barrow in about 1700–1500 BC. No contemporary burials have been found at the site, although later Iron Age ones have since been found, along with an Anglo-Saxon cemetery.

Only seven similar gold "unstable handled cups" (unstable because round-bottomed) have been found in Europe, all dating to the period between 1700 and 1500 BC. The Ringlemere cup is most similar to the other British example, the Rillaton gold cup found in Cornwall in 1837. The other examples are two from Germany, two from Switzerland, one now lost from Brittany, and an unprovenanced, perhaps German, example. Two other silver cups and, from Britain, two amber and some shale cups all share the same basic shapes (see Hove amber cup). The finds in Britain are in the approximate Wessex area, and on the continent near the Rhine or the Channel coast, suggesting that the vessels, though probably all made fairly locally to their find spots, related to a specific cross-channel trading zone.

The cup is usually on display in Room 2 of the Prehistory Galleries in the British Museum, London. As a popular gold piece, it is sometimes loaned to exhibitions.

== Description ==
The body of the cup was created by hammering a single piece of gold, with the handle cut from a flat strip of gold and attached by rivets. Although badly crushed by recent plough damage it can be seen to have been 14 cm high with corrugated sides. The cup resembles a late Neolithic (approximately 2300 BC) ceramic beaker with Corded Ware decoration, but dates to a much later period.

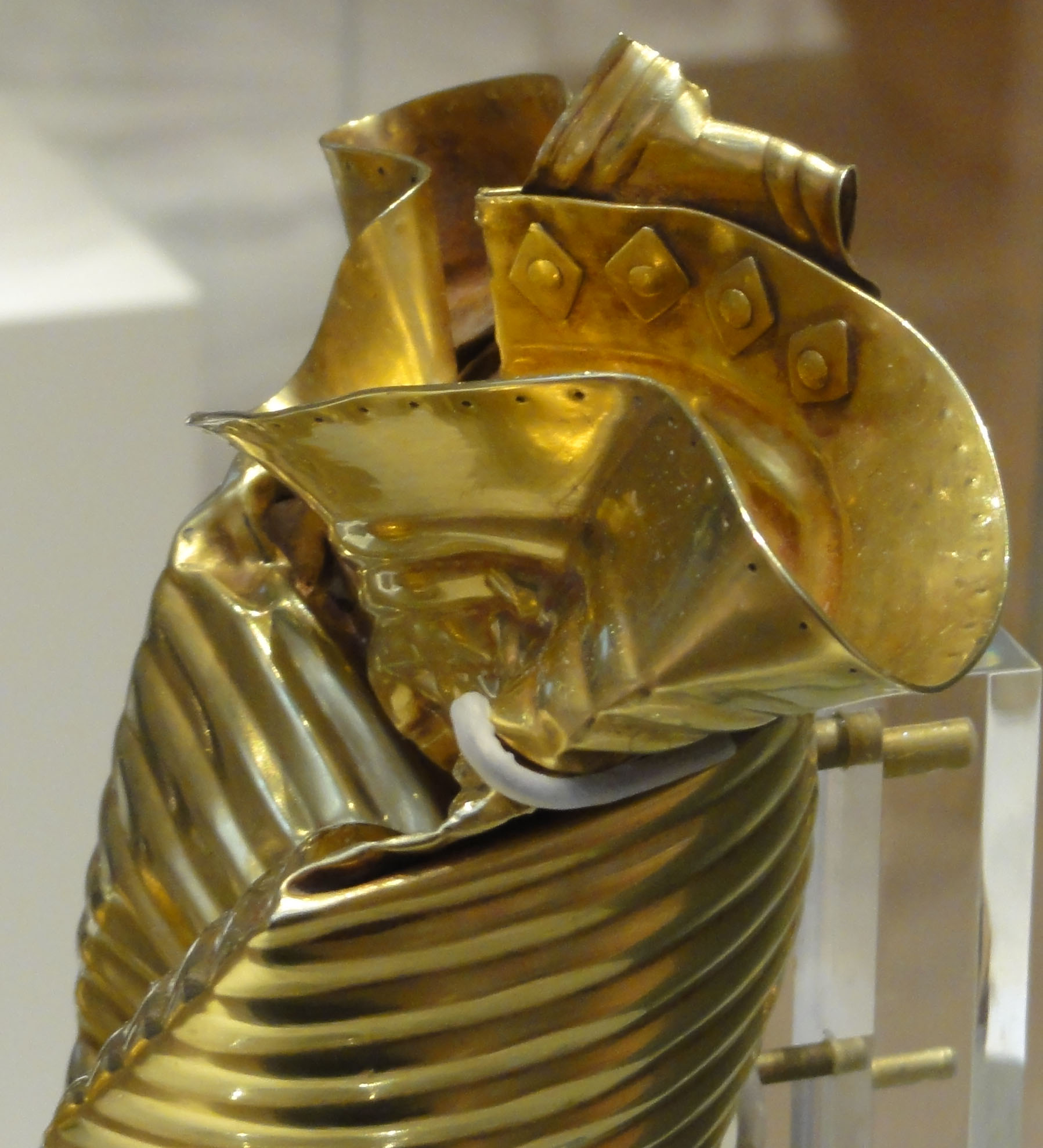
Side view showing rivets and pointillé lip decoration

== Discovery, purchase, and display ==
The cup was discovered on Ringlemere Farm by Cliff Bradshaw while using a metal detector on 4 November 2001. He reported the find to the local coroner's office, and through the Portable Antiquities Scheme and the Treasure Act 1996 the cup was recorded and declared to be treasure in 2002. It was bought by the British Museum for £270,000 (then roughly US$520,000), with the money paid split between Bradshaw and the Smith family who own Ringlemere Farm. The money to secure the cup for the nation was raised through donations by the Heritage Lottery Fund, the National Art Collections Fund, and The British Museum Friends.

After discovery of the cup, the site was excavated between 2002 and 2005 revealing a history starting with activity in the Mesolithic period, a number of Neolithic features and finds, a funerary complex of Early Bronze Age date (approximately 2300 BC), and an Anglo-Saxon cemetery.

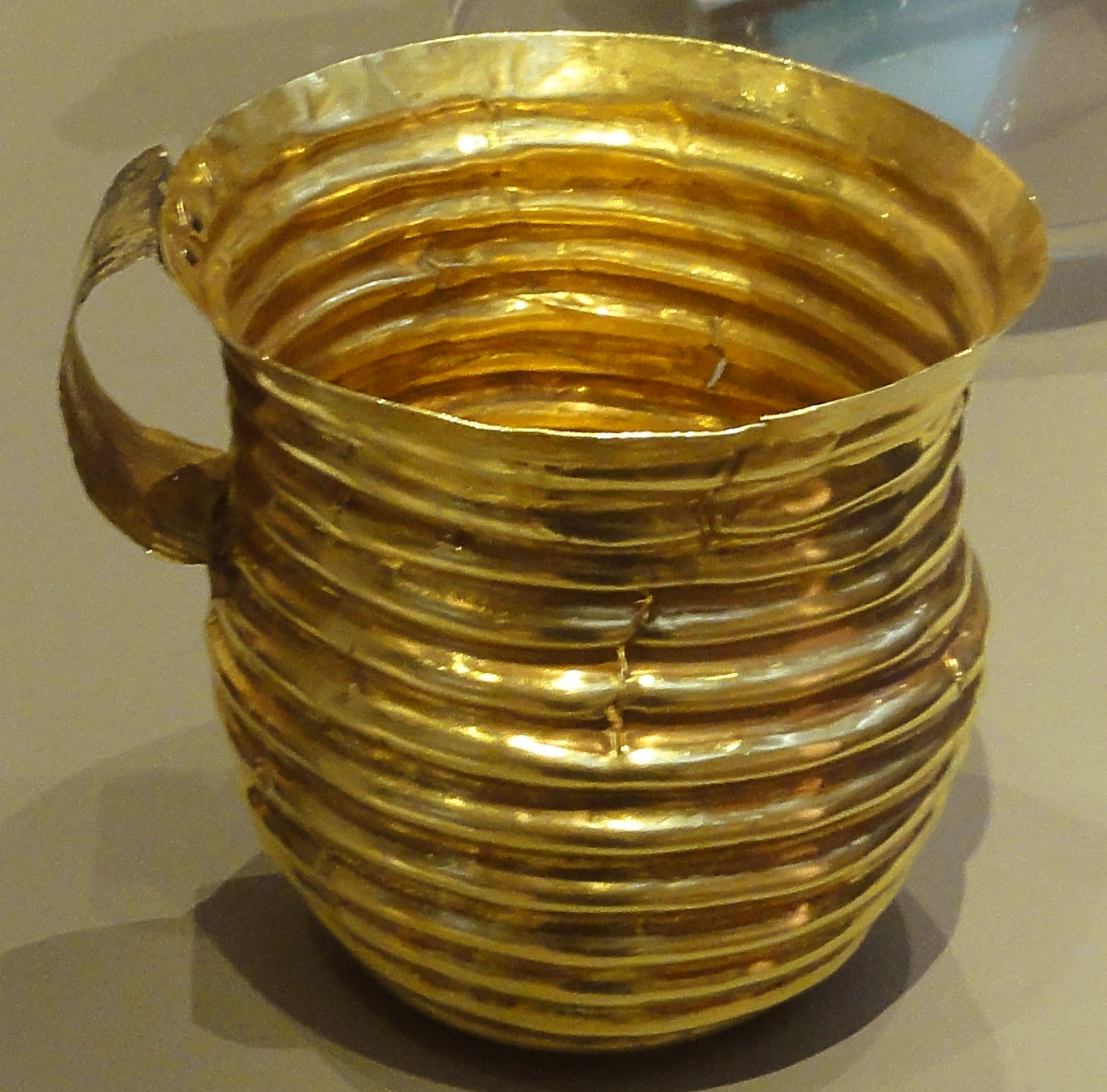
Rillaton gold cup

The cup was 10th in the list of British archaeological finds selected by experts at the British Museum for the 2003 BBC Television documentary Our Top Ten Treasures, which included an interview with Bradshaw.

=== Loans ===
From 14 May 2004 until 13 January 2006 the cup appeared in the museum's "Buried Treasure" exhibition on treasure trove, both at the museum itself and touring (to the National Museum & Gallery of Wales at Cardiff, Manchester Museum, the Hancock Museum at Newcastle, and the Norwich Castle Museum & Art Gallery). From 17 October to 26 February 2007 it was on temporary display in Dover Museum, closer to its find-spot, and it is now back in the Prehistory galleries.

== The Ringlemere Cup book ==
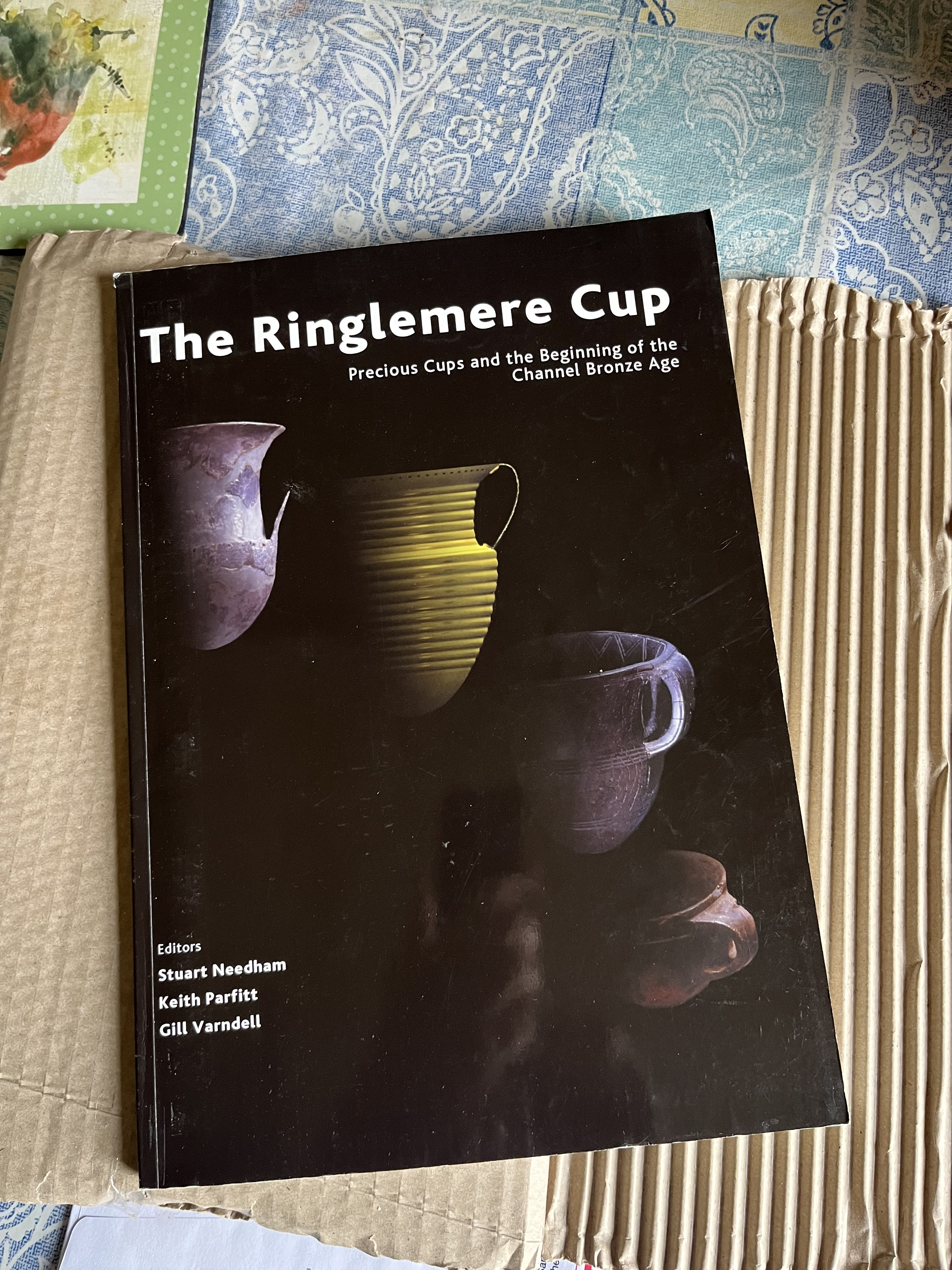
The book about the cup and the surrounding context, as well as the range of similar cups from across Europe

The excavation that started with the find of the cup itself and the research into the cup, along with its connection to other "unstable handled cups", as the book calls them, are all described in the publication by the British Museum in 2006, entitled The Ringlemere Cup- Precious Cups and the Beginning of the Channel Bronze Age.

== See also ==
- Gold working in the Bronze Age British Isles
- Hove amber cup
