= Musgrave family =

Prominent Anglo-Scottish Border family

Musgrave de Musgrave
- Anglo-Scottish Border family / Reiver clan
- Current region: Cumberland and Westmorland
- Origin: Great Musgrave, Westmorland
- Founded: before 1042
- Founder: Gamel, Lord of Musgrave

The Musgrave family was a prominent Anglo-Scottish Border family with many descendants in the United States of America, Australia and the United Kingdom a so-called Riding or Reiver clan of Cumberland and Westmorland. The earliest record of the Musgraves is Gamel, Lord of Musgrave. The Musgraves though often Wardens of the West March during the times of the Reivers and among the fourteen most notorious of the reiving clans were known locally as de’ils (devils) dozen and consisted of the following families: Armstrong, Bell, Carleton, Dacre, Elliot, Graham, Johnstone, Kerr, Maxwell, Musgrave, Nixon, Routledge, Scott and Storey.

Whether the family origin is Anglo-Saxon, Norman, or Strathclyde Briton is unclear. The family name may be derived from several etymological possibilities. The surname is of toponymic origin, from the Anglo-Saxon mus for "mouse" and grav for "mossy plain". The historian William Camden said that they gained their name from the village of Great Musgrave, where they settled, but Arthur Collins suggested that the name was a variation of the title margrave, meaning march-warden.

The Coat of Arms probably adopted by the Musgraves during the 13th century depicts six gold annulets, three, two and one, on a blue shield. The first recorded spelling of the family name is believed to be that of Alan de Musegrave, which was dated 1228, in the "Curia Rolls of Northumberland". A branch of the family lived in the mansion of Edenhall - a mythology probably based on Tennyson's Poem "The Luck of Eden Hall" whose fortune was assured by a lucky glass beaker which survived from the 14th century — the Luck of Edenhall.

== Gamel de Musgrave ==
Gamel de Musgrave was born about 1030. According to Plantagenet Harrison, the earliest record of him is "Gamel, Lord of Musgrave, of the county of Westmorland and divers manors in county Cumberland, living in the time of King Edward the Confessor (1042-1065)".

== Wascelinus de Musgrave ==
Lord of Musgrave, co. Westmorland, and divers manors, co. Cumberland, living in the time of William the Conqueror and King Henry I, 1066–1135.

== Stephen de Musgrave ==
Stephen fil. Wascelini, lord of Musgrave in Westmorland, seised of lands in the county of Cumberland temp. Hen. I and King Stephen; *owed the King three marks in silver for a plea, 4 Hen. II (1157).

== John de Musgrave ==
John de Musgrave, lord of Great and Little Musgrave, in the county of Westmorland, in the time of King Henry II; married Matilda, dau. and coheir of Adam de Carevile, lord of Carevile, co. Cumberland. Two sons: Adam and Walter. A fine was levied, 9 John, touching the division of the manor of Carevile, co. Cumberland, by which it was settled that he and Matilda his wife should have that half of the lands of the said manor towards the north, to hold to them and the heirs of said Matilda; and that the half of the lands of the said manor towards the south, should belong to William the son of Ivette, sister of the said Matilda, to hold to him and his heirs.

== Adam de Musgrave ==
Adam de Musgrave, lord of Great and Little Musgrave, co. Westmorland, in right of his father's inheritance, and lord of half the manor of Carevile, co. Cumberland, in right of his mother, in the time of King John and Henry III.

=== Walter de Musgrave ===
Living in the time of Henry II. One son, Peter, in a suit with Nicholas de Musgrave and Isabella, his wife, by Walter de Morton for trespass at Morton, 53 Hen. III.

== Thomas de Musgrave ==
Thomas de Musgrave, lord of Great and Little Musgrave, was the first-born son of Adam de Musgrave. He served as sheriff of Westmorland for a time, see 36 Hen. Ill.

He was surety for Hugh Paynel in a plea of land, see 27 Hen. Ill. He was named defendant in a plea, at the suit of Master William de Goldington, touching the grinding of corn at the plaintiff's mill at Saundeford, Westmorland, 37 Hen. Ill against whom, and Robert fil. Adam de Musgrave and his brother, Robert de Askeby claimed lands in Askeby, 40 Hen. Ill.

He entailed the manor of Musgrave upon his heir male, Edward I. He also brought suit against Michael fil. Nicholas de Musgrave, and Robert, William, and Richard, brothers of Michael, for cutting down trees, see 5 Edw. I.

After being levied a fine to confirm the lease of the third part of the manor and divers lands of Overton - previously given to Richard de Musgrave - he died soon afterwards.

Thomas de Musgrave bought Hartley Castle from Ralph de Neville in the 1300s. On October 4, 1353, King Edward III granted licence to crenellate the castle.

== Sir Richard de Musgrave ==
Sir Richard de Musgrave, chivaler, to whom his uncle, Thomas de Musgrave, gave lands and the third part of the manor of Overton, by deed dated on Monday next after the feast of St. Mark the Evangelist, 49 Hen. III;

- was appointed assessor in the county of Cumberland of the eighth and fifth granted by Parliament for the confirmation of the charter, 25 Edw. I;
- ob. 31 Edw. I.

== Sir Richard de Musgrave ==
Sir Richard de Musgrave, chivaler, son and heir;

- lord of Musgrave, etc., as heir to his uncle Thomas de Musgrave;
- lord of Crossby Gerard with the advowson of the church, and of Soulby, etc., in right of his wife;
- lord of Shelton and Netting, co. Bedford, in right of his mother;
- was in the Scottish wars temp. Edw. II and Edw. III.

== Sir Robert de Musgrave ==
Sir Robert de Musgrave, knt., lord of Musgrave, son and heir;

- was one of the commanders of the vanguard of the English army at the battle of Neville's Cross, 1346;
- was aged upwards of forty years at the death of his mother, 28 Edw. III;
- seised of lands, &c, in Danby and Ormesby-upon-Swale in right of his wife;
- was lord of Crossby Gerard and Soulby in right of his mother, and lord of Great and Little Musgrave, &c, in right of his father's inheritance.

== See also ==
- "The Adventure of the Musgrave Ritual" (a Sherlock Holmes short story)
