= Brighton Museum & Art Gallery =

Art and history museum in Brighton, East Sussex, England

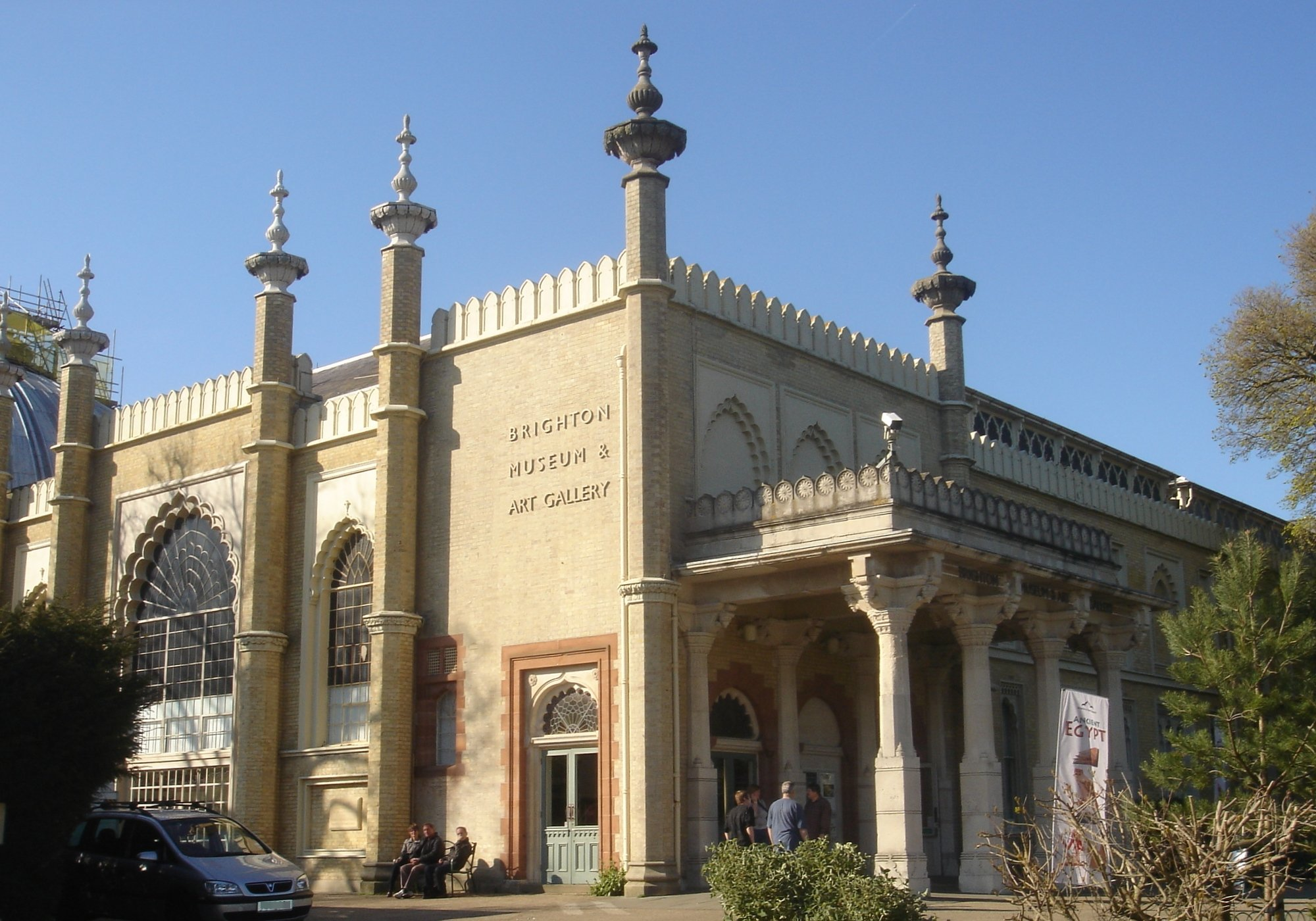
- Brighton Museum & Art Gallery building.

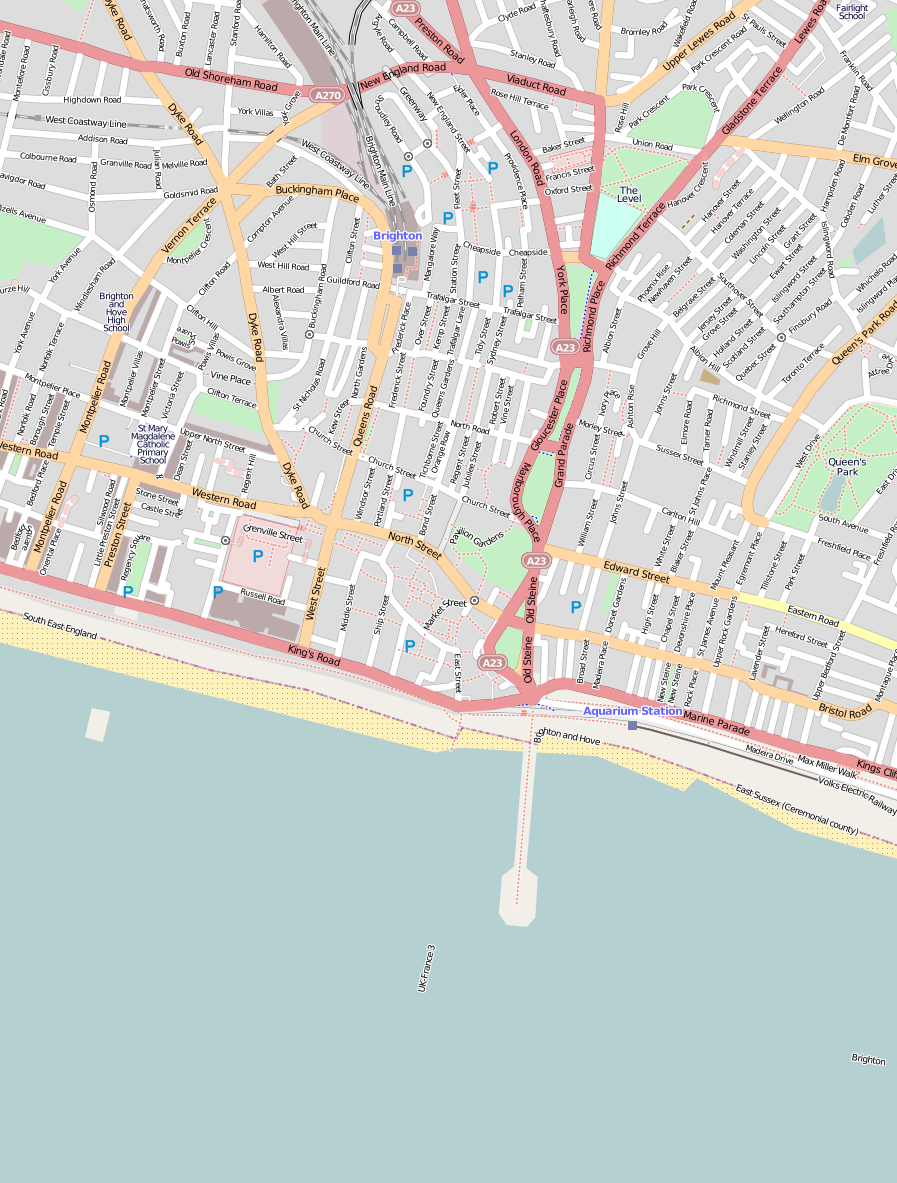
- Location within Brighton
- Established: 1805
- Location: Brighton, East Sussex, England
- Coordinates: 50.822°N 0.138°W
- Website: Website

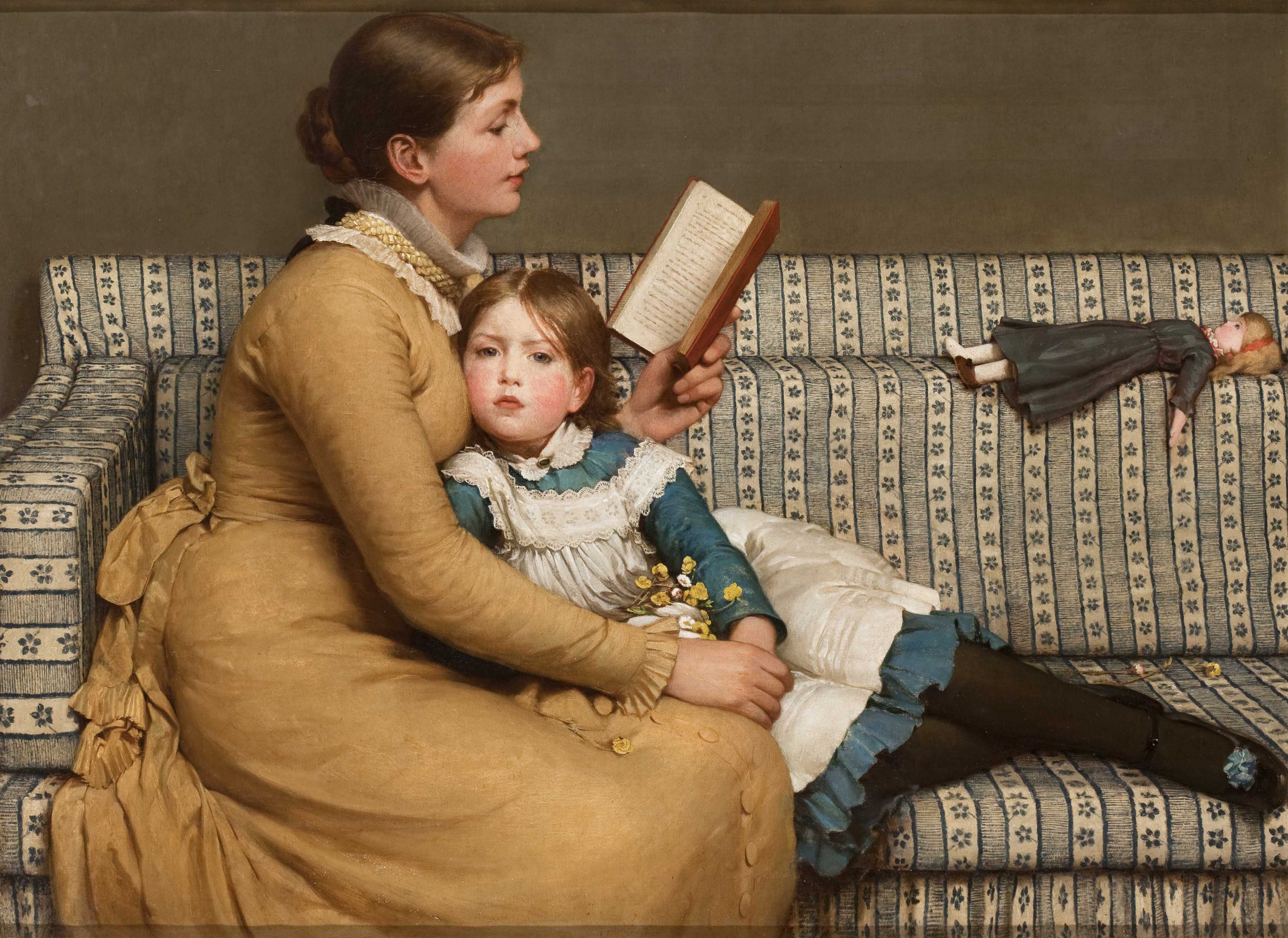
Alice in Wonderland, by George Dunlop Leslie, c. 1879

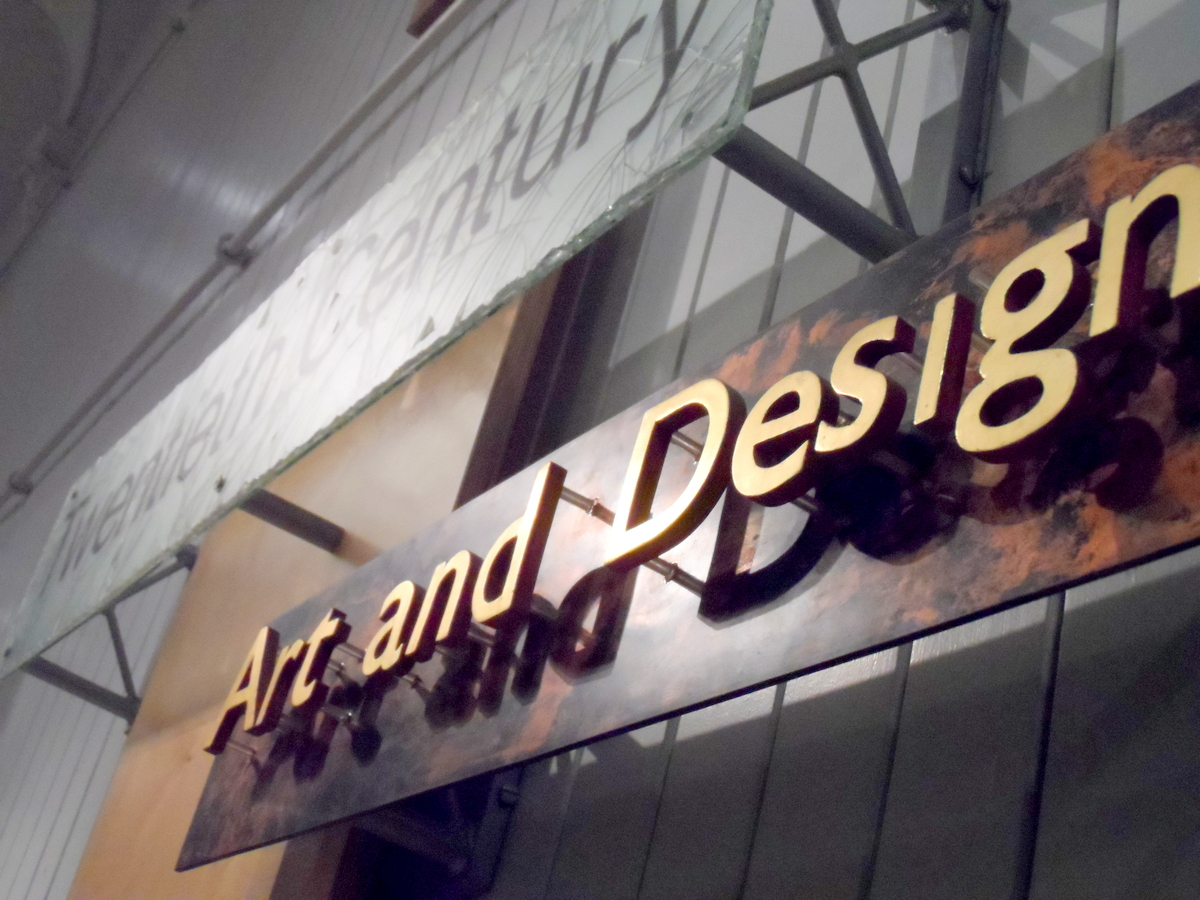
Signage in the main gallery

Brighton Museum & Art Gallery is a municipally owned public museum and art gallery in the city of Brighton and Hove in the South East of England. It is part of Brighton & Hove Museums. It costs £9.50 for a yearly pass, discounted to £7 for Brighton and Hove residents and students at local universities.

== History ==
The building which houses the collection is part of the Royal Pavilion Estate and was originally built for the Prince of Wales, later George IV and completed in 1805. It was initially intended as a tennis court but had never been finished, and later served as cavalry barracks.

After the death of George IV in 1830, his successor King William IV also stayed in the Pavilion on his visits to Brighton. However, after Queen Victoria's last visit to Brighton in 1845, the Government planned to sell the building and grounds. The Brighton Commissioners and the Brighton Vestry successfully petitioned the government to sell the Pavilion to the town for £53,000 in 1850 under the Brighton Improvement (Purchase of the Royal Pavilion and Grounds) Act 1850.

In September 1851 it was announced that part of the Pavilion was to be appropriated for annual art exhibitions and two months later the first of these was held. The local talent to which it was confined included Frederick Nash and Copley Fielding. The room devoted to the exhibition was the original South Gallery, now the First Conference Room, but later the exhibitions even spread to the Great Kitchen.

The stable building of the Pavilion estate, adjacent to the current museum premises, was used as a museum as early as 1856. It is now the site of the Brighton Dome – a performing arts venue.

The museum and art gallery occupied its current situation in the building in 1902. A major refurbishment of the museum and art gallery costing £10 million occurred in 2002. As a result, the traditional entrance to the museum and art gallery became the entrance of the Dome, the latter taking the museum's former entrance.

The museum is part of Brighton & Hove Museums, comprising

- Royal Pavilion
- Brighton Museum and Art Gallery
- Booth Museum
- Hove Museum of Creativity
- Preston Manor

== Collections ==
=== Overview ===
- The Decorative Art collection includes British, European and American applied art and design from 17th Century to present day including ceramics, glass, metalwork, furniture and jewellery. It also includes the contemporary craft collection and the Arts Council (South East) craft collection based at Hove Museum & Art Gallery.
- The Natural Sciences collection includes the Edward Booth collection of British Birds, zoological and geological collections. The collection also holds half a million insects (including butterflies) and a library of 14,000 natural history texts.
- The World Art collection contains over 13,000 objects and reference materials from Africa, Asia, the Pacific and Americas. One of its notable collectors was James Henry Green who collected material from Burma in the 1920s and 30s.
- The Fine Art Collection comprises sculpture, paintings, mixed media, prints and drawings from 15th – 20th century. There are notable pieces from European Old Masters, specifically the Italian, German, French and Netherlandish schools. The Fine Art collection also contains the Heyer Bequest of 20th Century American paintings by artists, including Frank Stella and Larry Poons. It also includes items donated by Edward James, the collector of surrealist art.
- The Fashion and Textiles collection contains British, European and North American textiles, costume and accessories from the 16th century to present day.
- The Toys collection contains toys, dolls and games from 18th century to present day. Its founding collection was the National Toy Museum & Institute of Play, containing over 20,000 items.
- The Film and Media collection contain equipment relating to the development of the early film industry in England 1896–1930. It includes magic lantern projectors and slides, early filmmaking equipment and ephemera.
- The Local and Social History collection includes objects, ephemera, oral history and photographs from 18th century to the present day, representing the social history of Brighton & Hove.
- The Archaeology collection includes material from sites in Brighton & Hove and international sites, including a large collection from Egypt.
- The Oral History collection contains audio recordings of personal memories and experiences of Brighton and Hove and histories relating to the world art, costume craft and film and media collections.
- The Preston Manor collection contains items bequeathed with the manor house in 1932 including furniture, silver, ceramics, pictures and rare books.

The Decorative Art, Natural Sciences and World Art collections are Designated collections which means they have been identified by the Museums, Libraries & Archives Council as collections of national and international importance (in a non-national museum service)

=== Notable exhibits ===
- A pair of breeches worn by George IV. The breeches are part of the royal wear section in the Costume & Textiles collection. They were made in 1827 and are hand stitched in green wool fabric. Breeches were worn in the 18th and early 19th century, but by 1810 trousers were becoming more popular. George IV preferred to wear breeches and banned trousers from court until 1815.
- A Kinemacolor camera made by Moy & Bastie around 1910. Kinemacolor was developed by George Albert Smith (one of the early pioneers in British film-making in Brighton & Hove) and was the first commercially viable colour film technique. The camera is part of the film and media collection.
- A hand-enamelled wall plaque made in 1934–1939 depicting life in Imperial India. It was designed by Clarice Cliff using a scene taken from the British Empire Panels designed by Frank Brangwyn. Cliff adapted designs from three of Brangwyn's panels which were produced by Royal Staffordshire Pottery.
- A toy toolbox containing miniature tools including a mallet, corkscrew and a screwdriver in the toy collection based at Hove Museum & Art Gallery. The handwritten ink on the toolbox lid reads ‘1846 Toolbox ELD from CLD’. It was made by Charles Lutwidge Dodgson, better known as author, photographer and mathematician Lewis Carroll.
- A portrait painted in coloured beeswax found fixed over the face of a mummified body in the Roman cemetery at Hawara in Egypt from the 2nd Century. His white robes are a deliberate display of status, distinguishing him as a member of the elite class of Romans who had settled in Egypt.
- Vietnamese water puppets from the mid-20th Century, hand painted and carved out of wood. Today, schools in Vietnam teach this art, once a guarded secret and passed down only from father to son. Water provides the magic and hides the mechanism of the puppet. Teu is the master of ceremonies and he introduces many different characters who perform their own story in turn.
- Edward Thomas Booth's hunting outfit, including leather wading boots, hat and gun. Booth's large collection of British Birds was developed into a museum in 1874. At this point it was known as Booth Museum of British Birds and was not open to the public, which occurred gradually with charitable fundraising events. By then he had formulated his ambition to exhibit one example of every species British bird and set about the task building up his collection and travelled around the country to collect his specimens.
- A drinking beaker from the local history collection made from horn, dating from the early 19th century. Around this time Brighton had one inn for every thirty houses. The beaker has the faint inscription: ‘Greyhound Inn Brighton, 1821'. The Greyhound Inn was situated at the corner of Pool Valley in Brighton.
- The Hove amber cup, which is considered to be one of Britain's most important Bronze Age finds. It was discovered in 1856 when a burial mound was excavated to make way for the building of Palmeira Avenue, Hove. Inside the mound was an oak coffin which contained bone fragments, a dagger, a whetstone and an axe head as well as the Amber Cup, made from a single piece of amber.
