= Rillaton Barrow =

Barrow in Cornwall

- Krug Reslegh (Cornish)
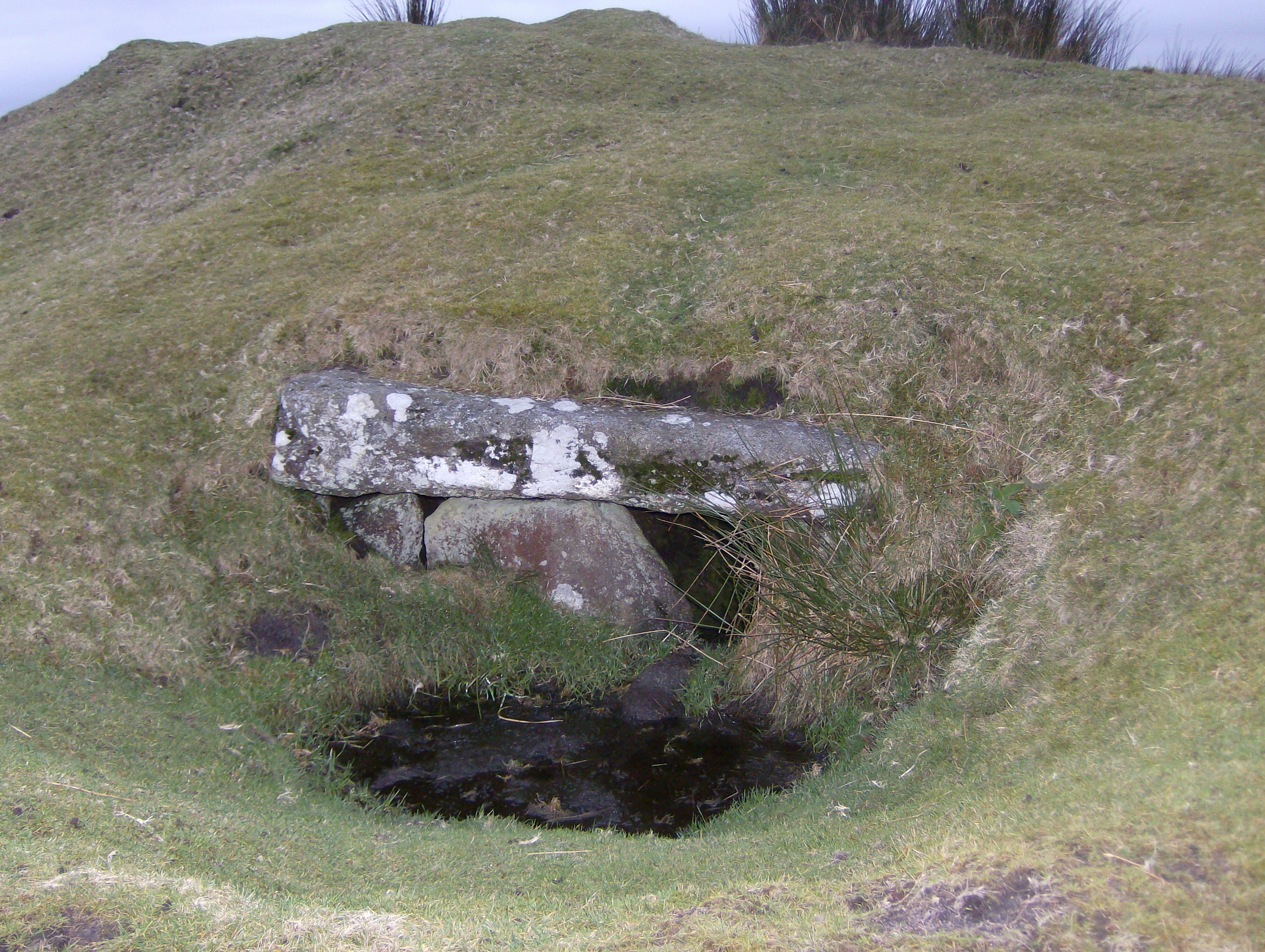
- Blocked up entrance to the Rillaton Barrow

- Location in Cornwall
- 50°31′16″N 4°27′21″W
- Type: Round barrow
- Location: Linkinhorne, Cornwall
- OS grid reference: SX 26021 71911

History
- Built: c. 1700 BC

Site notes
- Material: Stone rubble and earth
- Height: 2.7 m (8 ft 10 in)
- Diameter: 34 m (112 ft)
- Owner: English Heritage
- Management: Cornwall Heritage Trust

Scheduled monument
- Official name: The Rillaton Barrow, 500m NNE of The Hurlers stone circles
- Designated: 10 February 1958
- Reference no.: 1010233

The Rillaton Barrow (Cornish: Krug Reslegh) is a Bronze Age round barrow in Cornwall, United Kingdom. The site is on the eastern flank of Bodmin Moor in the parish of Linkinhorne about 4 miles (6.4 km) north of Liskeard.

Rillaton Barrow was excavated in 1837 and found to contain a centrally-placed inhumation beneath the 34-metre wide barrow. The burial had been placed in a stone cist measuring 2 meters by almost 1 meter. Human remains were found along with grave goods including the Rillaton Gold Cup, a bronze dagger, beads, pottery, glass and other items.

== Rillaton Gold Cup ==
Most notably, the burial contained the Rillaton Gold Cup, a biconical gold vessel, around 9 cm high, (Note: 85 mm according to the British Museum website, 95 mm according to Needham et al.) with a handle attached with rivets. The cup resembles a late Neolithic (approx 2300 BC) ceramic beaker with corded decoration and until 2007 was thought to date to a much later period of c. 1650-1400 BC. In 2001, the similar Ringlemere Cup was found which has a similar corded style termed grooved ware, though it was (and remains) crushed nearly flat. Subsequent theories that it might have been deposited as a votive offering have now been abandoned in favour of it being part of the original grave goods in the Ringlemere barrow.

The cup shows an Aegean style and resembles similar finds from the Greek site of Mycenae, suggesting cultural and trading links with the Eastern Mediterranean Sea. The Rillaton Cup and the Pelynt Dagger are two artefacts that have been found in Cornwall that have been claimed to show contact with the Mycenaean world. However a 2006 study by Stuart Needham and others sees no reason to look so far afield for parallels, and locates them in a group with other "unstable" cups (round-bottomed and unable to stand up) in precious materials found in north-western Europe. They propose a date around 1700 BC for the Rillaton Cup, though it may have been buried a long time after it was made. In contrast, the Pelynt Dagger might actually be Mycenaean.

After their discovery in 1837 the finds were sent as Duchy Treasure trove to King William IV, and remained in the royal household. (Note: Ian Richardson, Treasure Registrar for the Portable Antiquities Scheme has been quoted as saying "One of them – either King George IV [sic] or William IV – was rumoured to have used it to store cufflinks on their mantelpiece". Philip Payton related the story that after being lost for many years the cup turned up "in use by King George V as a receptacle for his collar studs!") After the death of King George V in 1936, the importance of the cup and associated dagger came to be appreciated, leading to their loan to the British Museum, where the cup remains on show next to the similar Ringlemere Cup, though still belonging to the Royal Collection. The other objects found with the cup have now disappeared, and "no useful descriptions or depictions are known"; they might well have helped assess the date. A replica of the cup is in the Royal Cornwall Museum at Truro.

A legend associated with the cup is that Rillaton is haunted by the spirit of a druid priest, who offers travellers a drink from an undrainable cup. One night a traveller threw the cup's contents at the ghost, and was later found dead in a ravine.

== Gallery ==
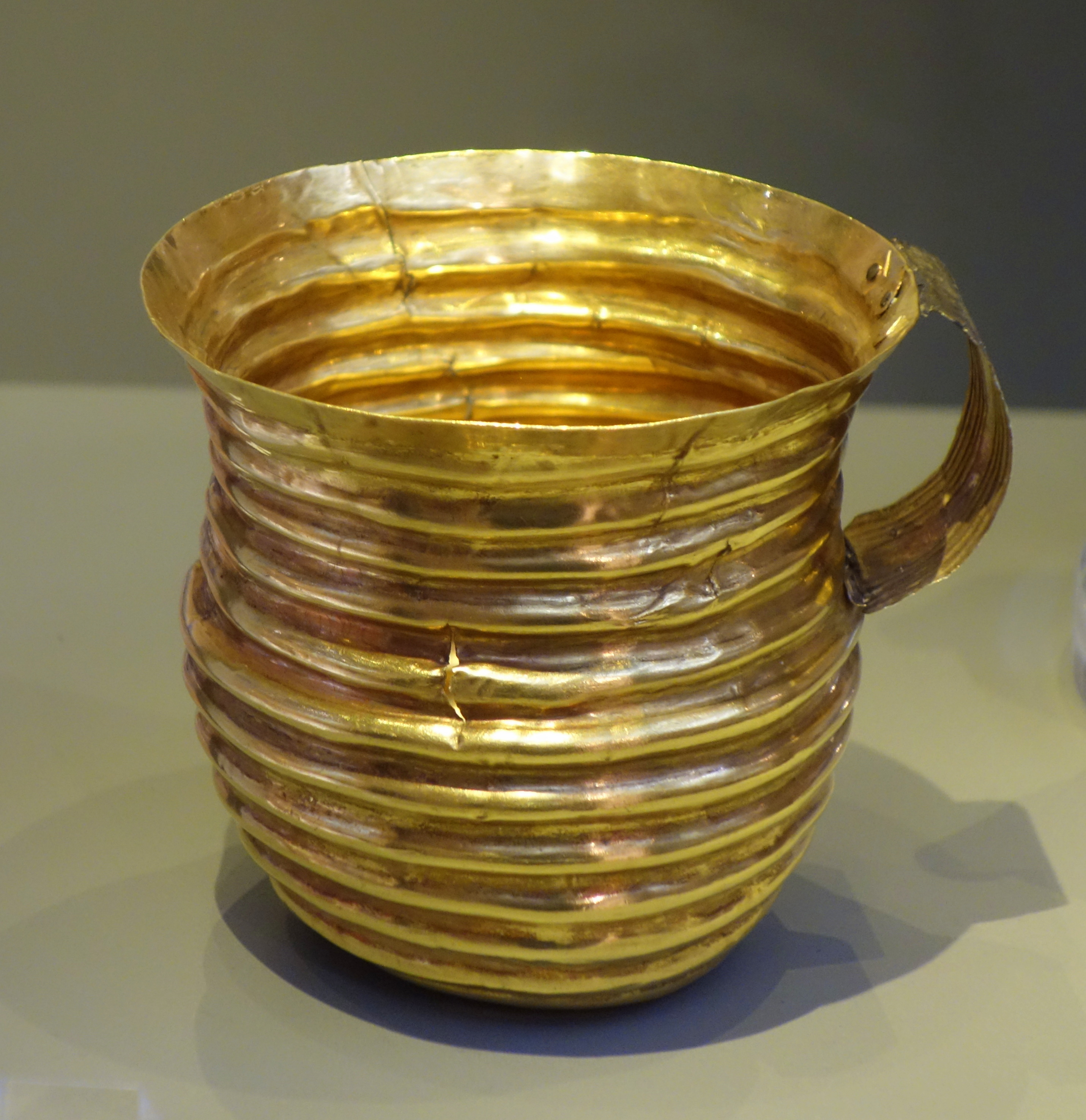
The Rillaton gold cup

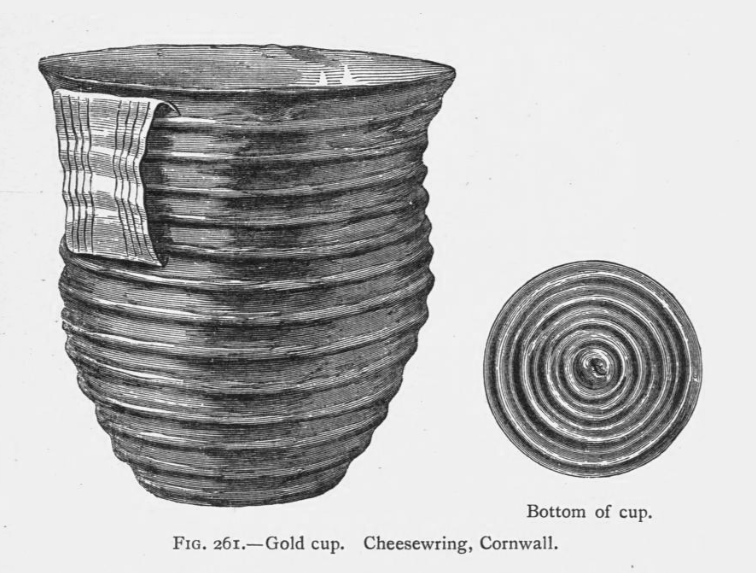
Drawing of the Rillaton gold cup

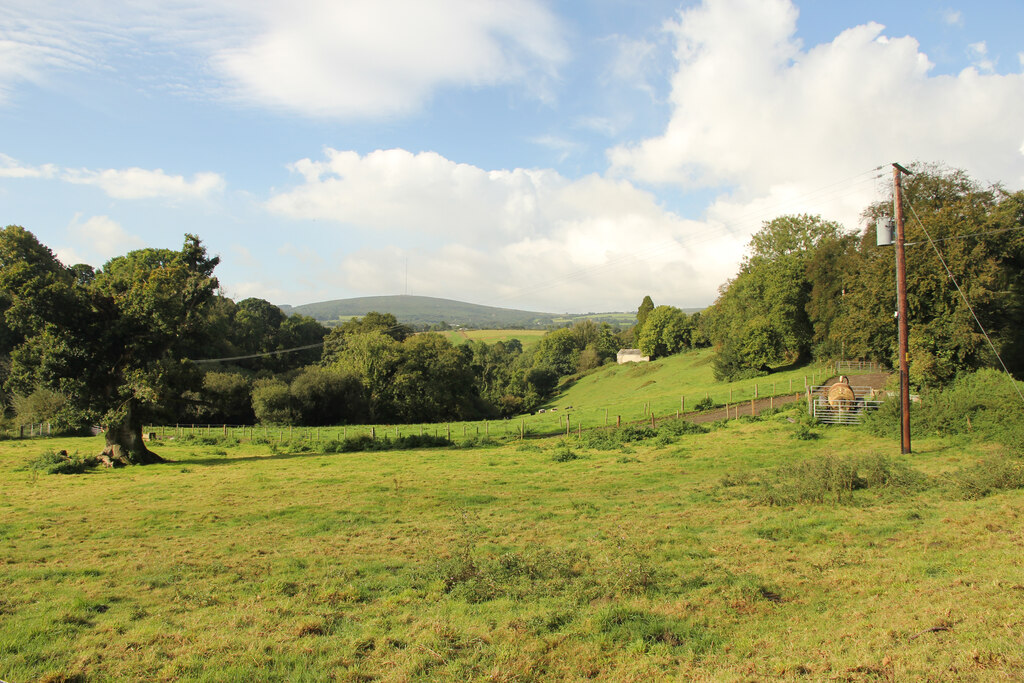

== See also ==
- Cornish Bronze Age
- Gold working in the Bronze Age British Isles
- Caerwgrle Bowl
- Fairy cup legend

== Sources ==
- Needham, Stuart; Parfitt, Keith; Varndell, Gillian (Eds) The Ringlemere Cup: Precious Cups and the Beginning of the Channel Bronze Age, 2006, British Museum Research Publication 163, ISBN 978-086159-163-3
