= Luck of Edenhall =

14th-century enamelled glass beaker

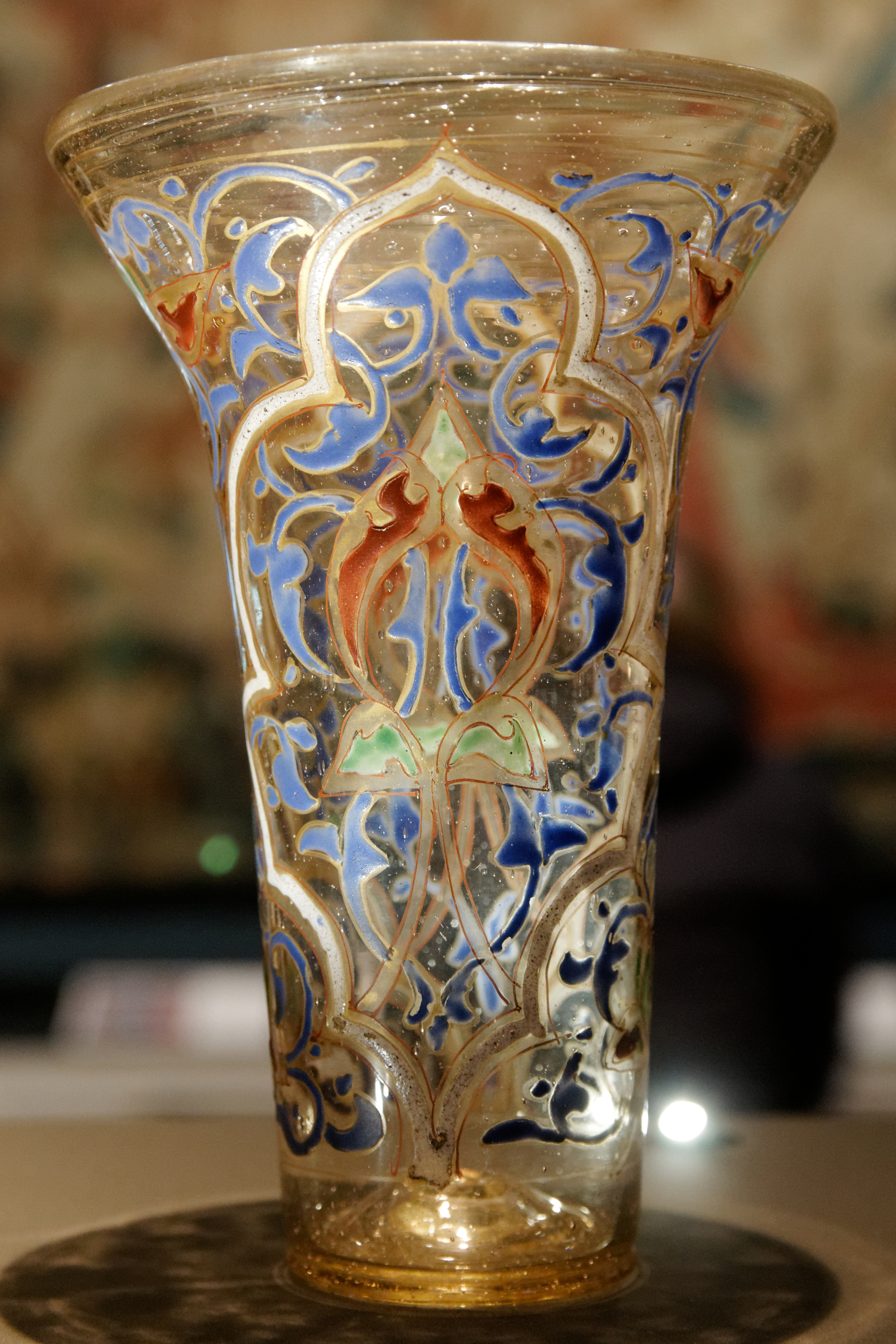
The Luck of Edenhall, mid-14th century V&A Museum no. C.1 to B-1959

The "Luck of Edenhall" is an enamelled glass beaker that was made in Syria or Egypt in the middle of the 14th century, elegantly decorated with interlaced arches and arabesques in blue, green, red and white enamel with gilding. The beaker is now known to be an exceptionally fine and pristine example of 14th-century luxury Islamic glass. It is now in the Victoria and Albert Museum in London and is 15.8 cm high and 11.1 cm wide at the brim. It had reached Europe by the 15th century, when it was provided with a decorated stiff case in boiled leather with a lid, probably made in France or England, which includes the Christian IHS; this no doubt helped it to survive over the centuries.

The antiquity of the legend surrounding it has not been determined. A number of rare objects owned by families in the North of England were known as "lucks"; the glass is first documented, and named as the "Luck of Edenhall", in 1677 in the will of Sir Philip Musgrave.

Glass drinking vessels very rarely survive—or remain in one family—for long enough to acquire a legendary status, so the successful passing of this vessel through many generations of the Musgrave family of Edenhall, Cumberland is exceptional. Legend has it that this ancient beaker embodied the continuing prosperity of its owners. Telling the story in The Gentleman's Magazine in 1791, the Rev. William Mounsey of Bottesford wrote:

Tradition our only guide here, says, that a party of Fairies were drinking and making merry round a well near the Hall, called St. Cuthbert's Well; but being interrupted by the intrusion of some curious people, they were frightened, and made a hasty retreat, and left the cup in question: one of the last screaming out;

"If this cup should break or fall
Farewell the Luck of Edenhall!"

The glass remained intact in the possession of the Musgrave family. In 1926, the glass was loaned to the Victoria and Albert Museum, and in 1958, it was finally acquired for the nation. It remains on permanent view in the Medieval & Renaissance galleries. Eden Hall no longer exists, having been demolished in 1934.

== Cultural references ==
It was the subject of a German ballad by Ludwig Uhland, later rendered in English by Henry Wadsworth Longfellow; this wrongly says the glass was shattered:

As the goblet ringing flies apart
Suddenly cracks the vaulted hall;
And through the rift the wild flames start;
The guests in dust are scattered all,
With the breaking Luck of Edenhall!

In storms the foe with fore and sword;
He in the night had scaled the wall,
Slain by the sword lies the youthful Lord,
But holds in his hand the crystal tall,
The shattered luck of Edenhall.

The legend of the Edenhall Cup is mentioned in the first chapter of Anthony Trollope's novel The Small House at Allington saying that guests had to drink from the cup regardless of the danger that it might break.

The Luck of Eden Hall is a pop/Psych/prog band established in Chicago in 1989, with releases on many record labels including Limited Potential (USA), Fruits de Mer Records (UK), Mega Dodo (UK), Headspin Records (NL), Vincebus Eruptum (IT), and has appeared in magazines including Shindig, Prog, Classic Rock, Goldmine, and AP.

The story of the Luck of Edenhall is told in the 2004 manga Bartender. It is also the namesake for the protagonists's bar, Bar Eden Hall.

== See also ==
- Fairy cup legend

== Bibliography ==
- V&A: "The Luck of Edenhall in the Victoria and Albert Museum". Victoria and Albert Museum. 2012-05-08.
- Jackson, Anna, ed. (2001). V&A: A Hundred Highlights. V&A Publications. ISBN 1-85177-365-7
- Davies, Glyn (January 2010). "New Light on the Luck of Edenhall". The Burlington Magazine. pp. 4–7 – via Academia.edu.
- Beard, Charles R., Luck And Talismans: A Chapter of Popular Superstition, 2004 reprint, Kessinger Publishing, ISBN 1417976489, 9781417976485, Chapter VII gives a full if partly outdated account of the Luck and its legend, google books
