= Edenhall =

Village in Cumbria, England

Coordinates: 54.685°N 2.673°W

- Village
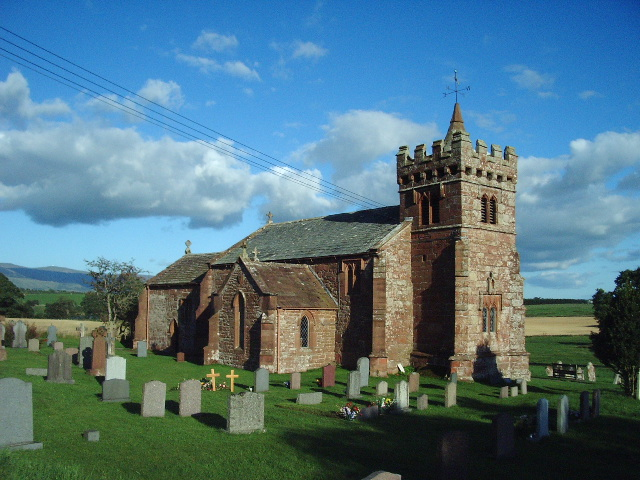
- St Cuthbert's Church

- Location in the former Eden District Location within Cumbria
- OS grid reference: NY566324
- Civil parish: Langwathby
- Unitary authority: Westmorland and Furness
- Ceremonial county: Cumbria
- Region: North West
- Country: England
- Sovereign state: United Kingdom
- Post town: PENRITH
- Postcode district: CA11
- Dialling code: 01768
- Police: Cumbria
- Fire: Cumbria
- Ambulance: North West
- UK Parliament: Penrith and Solway

Edenhall is a clustered village and former civil parish, now in the south-west of the parish of Langwathby, 800m to the north in the Westmorland and Furness district, in Cumbria, England. Edenhall has a church called St Cuthbert's Church. The name Edenhall originates from Eden Hall house, the seat of the Musgrave family of Hartley Castle, Cumberland many of whom were members of the House of Commons. In 1931 the civil parish had a population of 216. On 1 April 1934 the civil parish was merged into Langwathby.

== Eden Hall ==
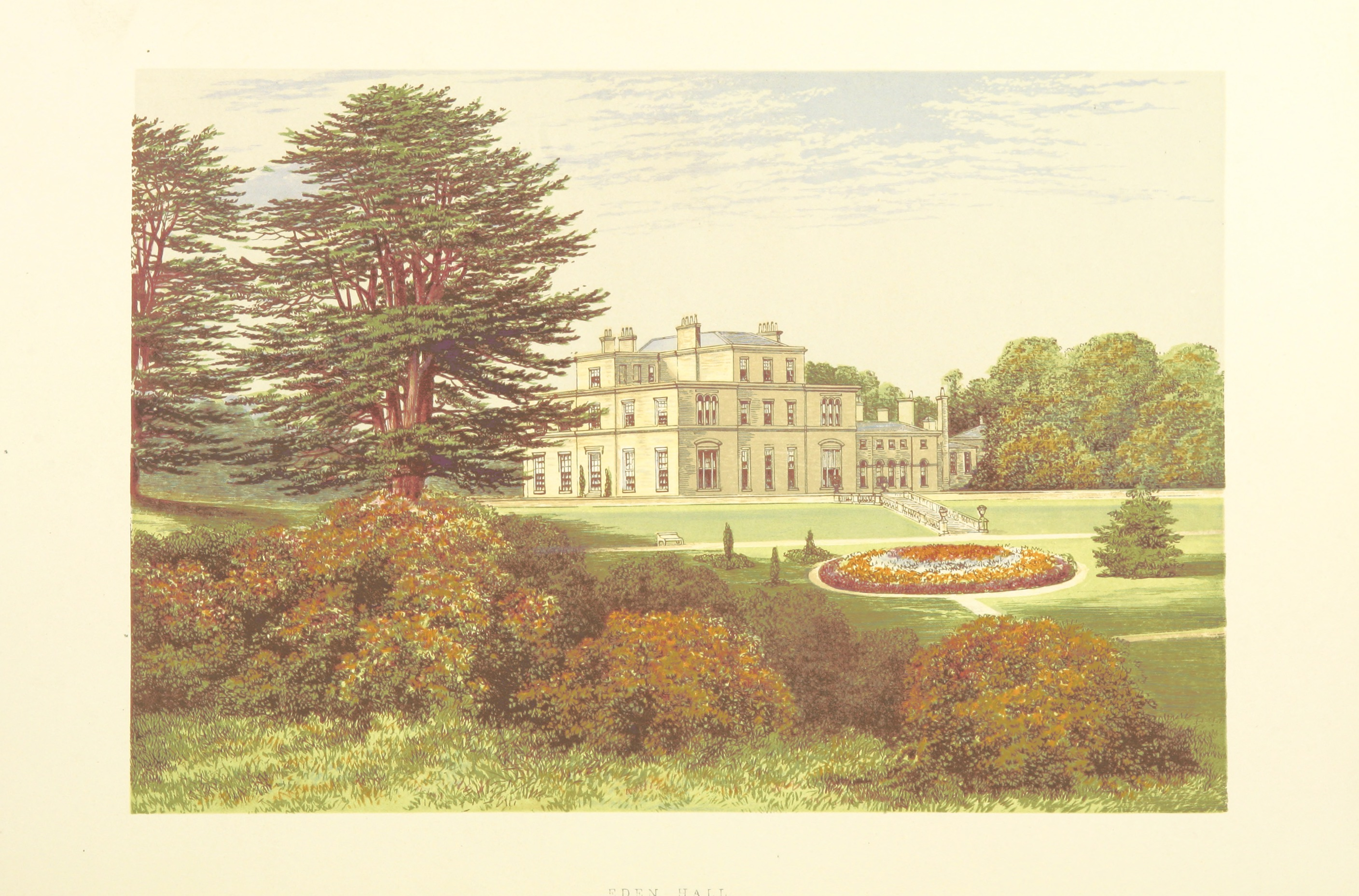
Eden Hall in 1869; since demolished

The original Eden Hall was extended in the 1700s from materials salvaged from the demolition of Hartley Castle, the ancestral home of the Musgrave family. It was rebuilt in 1821 employing the architect Sir Robert Smirke and rebuilt again in white stone in an Italianate style in the late 1860s. The hall was sold in the early 1900s, when the Musgrave family moved to London, and was demolished in 1934, leaving its 19th-century courtyard of stables and coach houses which has been divided into seven properties retaining some stables.

The hall was noteworthy as the home of the Luck of Edenhall, an enamel and gilt glass beaker from the 14th century, once owned by the Musgrave family and currently in pristine condition. While reputedly stolen from the fairies during its history, it is actually an Islamic piece dating from the 14th century. It is now in the Victoria and Albert Museum in west London.

== See also ==
- Listed buildings in Langwathby
