= Charles Barry =

English architect (1795–1860)

Sir Charles Barry FRS RA
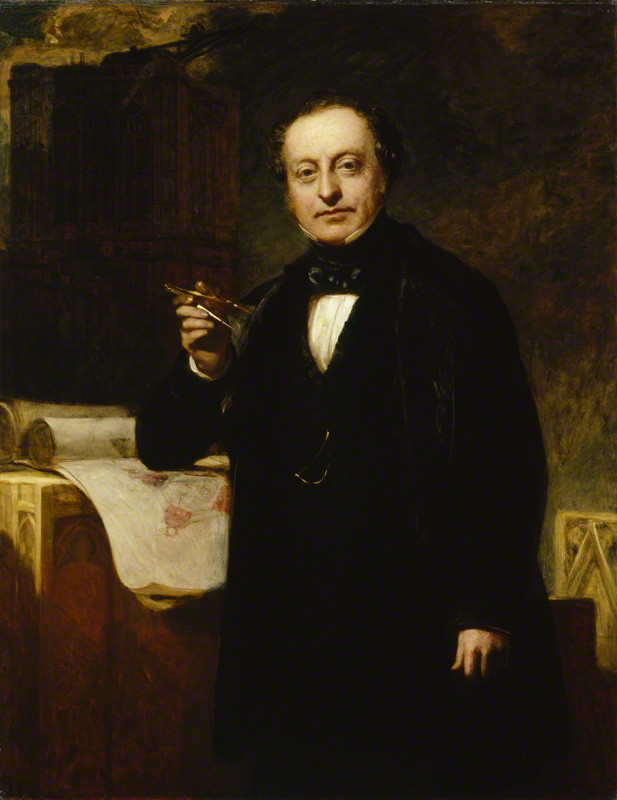
- Portrait of Charles Barry by John Prescott Knight, c. 1851
- Born: 23 May 1795; Westminster, London, England
- Died: 12 May 1860 (aged 64); London, England
- Occupation: Architect
- Spouse: Sarah Rowsell
- Children: Charles Barry Jr. Edward Middleton Barry
- Awards: Royal Gold Medal (1850)
- Buildings: Palace of Westminster l
- Resting place: Westminster Abbey

Sir Charles Barry (23 May 1795 – 12 May 1860) was an English architect best known for his role in the rebuilding of the Palace of Westminster (also known as the Houses of Parliament) in London during the mid-19th century, but also responsible for numerous other buildings and gardens. He is known for his major contribution to the use of Italianate architecture in Britain, especially the use of the Palazzo as basis for the design of country houses, city mansions and public buildings. He also developed the Italian Renaissance garden style for the many gardens he designed around country houses.

== Background and training ==
Born on 23 May 1795 in Bridge Street, Westminster (opposite the future site of the Clock Tower of the Palace of Westminster), he was the fourth son of Walter Edward Barry (died 1805), a stationer, and Frances Barry (née Maybank; died 1798). He was baptised at St Margaret's, Westminster, into the Church of England, of which he was a lifelong member. His father remarried shortly after Frances died and Barry's stepmother Sarah would bring him up.

He was educated at private schools in Homerton and then Aspley Guise, before being apprenticed to Middleton & Bailey, Lambeth architects and surveyors, at the age of 15. Barry exhibited drawings at the Royal Academy annually from 1812 to 1815. Upon the death of his father, Barry inherited a sum of money that allowed him, after coming of age, to undertake an extensive Grand Tour around the Mediterranean and Middle East, from 28 June 1817 to August 1820.

He visited France and, while in Paris, spent several days at the Louvre. In Rome, he sketched antiquities, sculptures and paintings at the Vatican Museums and other galleries, before carrying on to Naples, Pompeii, Bari and then Corfu. While in Italy, Barry met Charles Lock Eastlake, an architect, William Kinnaird and Francis Johnson (later a professor at Haileybury and Imperial Service College) and Thomas Leverton Donaldson.

With these gentlemen he visited Greece, where their itinerary covered Athens, which they left on 25 June 1818, Mount Parnassus, Delphi, Aegina, then the Cyclades, including Delos, then Smyrna and the Ottoman Empire, where Barry greatly admired the magnificence of Hagia Sophia. From Constantinople he visited the Troad, Assos, Pergamon and back to Smyrna. In Athens, he met David Baillie, who was taken with Barry's sketches and offered to pay him £200 a year plus any expenses to accompany him to Egypt, Palestine and Syria in return for Barry's drawings of the countries they visited. Middle East sites they visited included Dendera, the Temple of Edfu and Philae – it was at the last of these three that he met his future client, William John Bankes, on 13 January 1819 – then Thebes, Luxor and Karnak. Then, back to Cairo and Giza with its pyramids.

Continuing through the Middle East, the major sites and cities visited were Jaffa, the Dead Sea, Jerusalem, including the Church of the Holy Sepulchre, then Bethlehem, Baalbek, Jerash, Beirut, Damascus and Palmyra, then on to Homs.

On 18 June 1819, Barry parted from Baillie at Tripoli. Over this time, Barry created more than 500 sketches. Barry then travelled on to Cyprus, Rhodes, Halicarnassus, Ephesus and Smyrna from where he sailed on 16 August 1819 for Malta.

Barry then sailed from Malta to Syracuse, Sicily, then Italy and back through France. His travels in Italy exposed him to Renaissance architecture and after arriving in Rome in January 1820, he met architect John Lewis Wolfe, who inspired Barry himself to become an architect. Their friendship continued until Barry died. The building that inspired Barry's admiration for Italian architecture was the Palazzo Farnese. Over the following months, he and Wolfe together studied the architecture of Vicenza, Venice, Verona and Florence, where the Palazzo Strozzi greatly impressed him.

== Early career ==
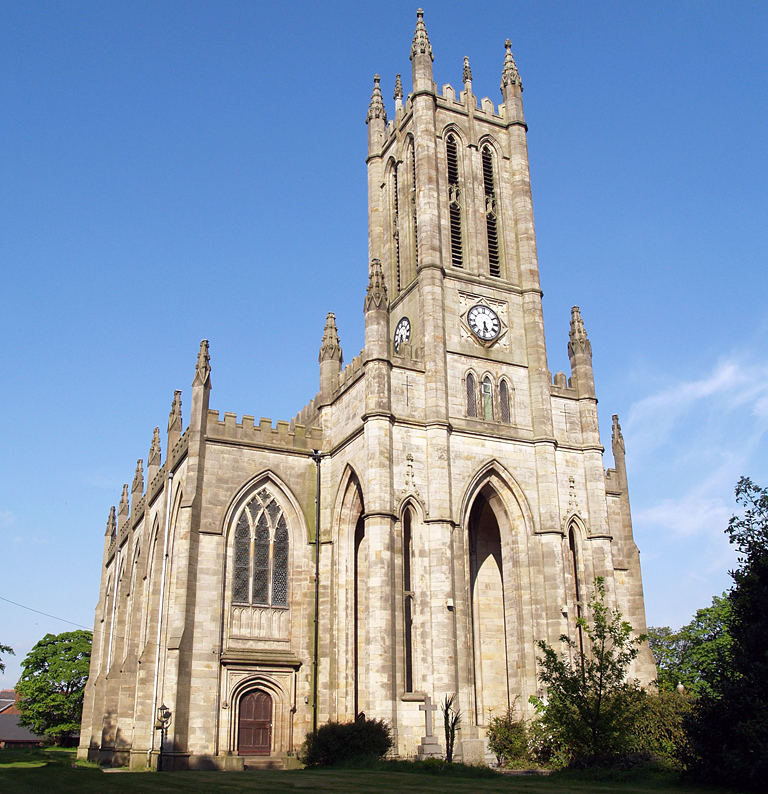
All Saints' Church, Whitefield

While in Rome he had met Henry Petty-Fitzmaurice, 3rd Marquess of Lansdowne, through whom he met Henry Vassall-Fox, 3rd Baron Holland, and his wife, Elizabeth Fox, Baroness Holland. Their London home, Holland House, was the centre of the Whig Party. Barry remained a lifelong supporter of the Liberal Party, the successor to the Whig Party. Barry was invited to the gatherings at the house, and there met many of the prominent members of the group; this led to many of his subsequent commissions. Barry set up his home and office in Ely Place in 1821. In 1827 he moved to 27 Foley Place, then in 1842 he moved to 32 Great George Street and finally to The Elms, Clapham Common. Now 29 Clapham Common Northside, the Georgian house of five bays and three stories was designed by Samuel Pepys Cockerell as his own home.

Probably thanks to his fiancée's friendship with John Soane, Barry was recommended to the Church Building Commissioners, and was able to obtain his first major commissions building churches for them. These were in the Gothic Revival architecture style, including two in Lancashire, St Matthew's Church, Manchester (1821–22), and All Saints' Church, Whitefield (or Stand) (1822–25). Barry designed three churches for the Commissioners in Islington: Holy Trinity, St John's and St Paul's, all in the Gothic style and built between 1826 and 1828.

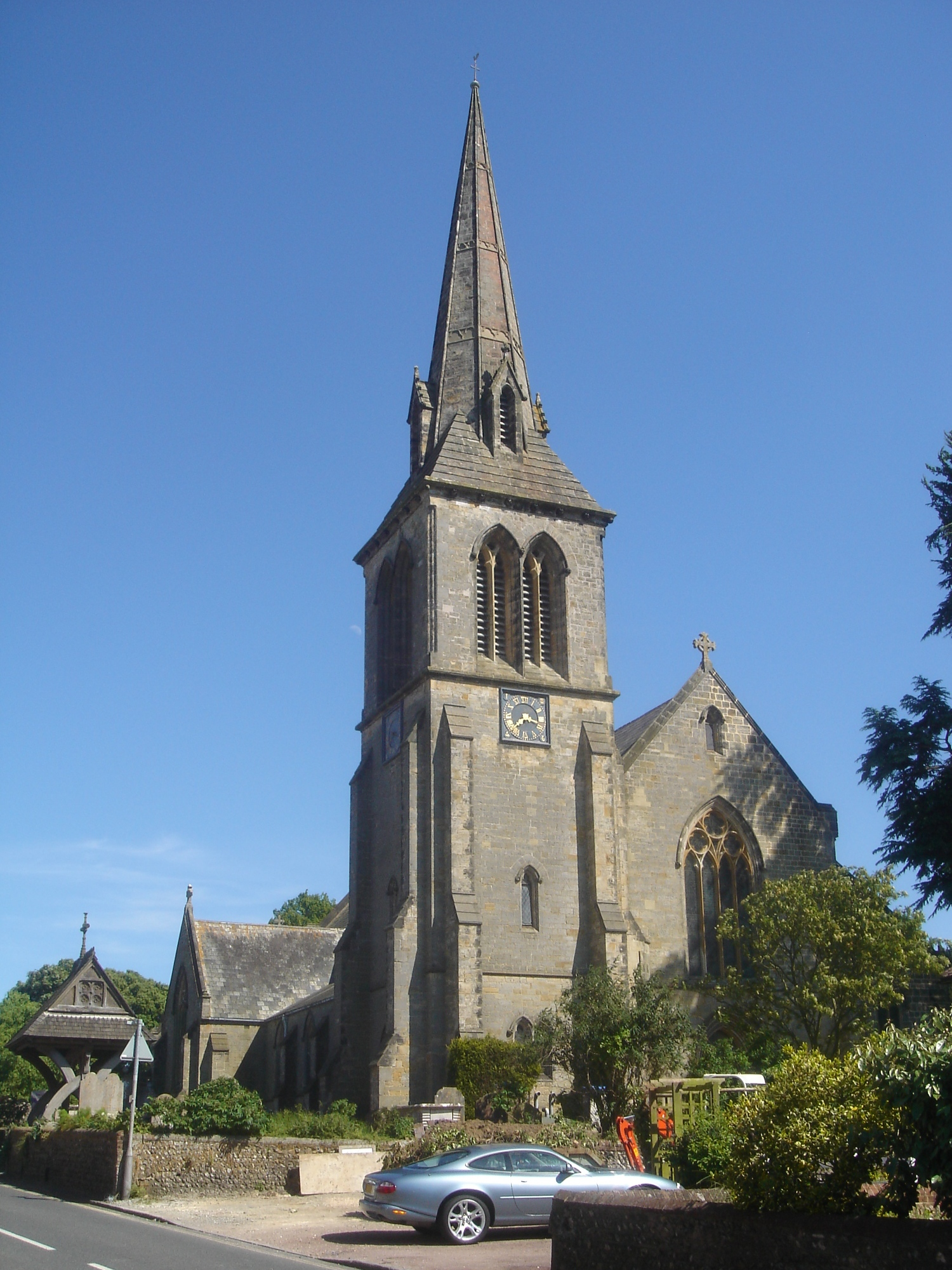
Holy Trinity Church, Hurstpierpoint

Two further Gothic churches in Lancashire, not for the Commissioners followed in 1824: St Saviour's Church, Ringley, partially rebuilt in 1851–54, and Barry's neglected Welsh Baptist Chapel, on Upper Brook Street (1837–39) in Manchester (and owned by the City Council), long open to the elements and at serious risk after its roof was removed in late 2005, the building was converted to private apartments in 2014–17. His final church for the Commissioners' was the Gothic St Peter's Church, Brighton (1824–28), which he won in a design competition on 4 August 1823 and was his first building to win acclaim.

The next church he designed was St Andrew's Hove, East Sussex, in Waterloo Street, Brunswick, (1827–28); the plan of the building is in line with Georgian architecture, though stylistically the Italianate style was used, the only classical church Barry designed that was actually built. The Gothic Hurstpierpoint church (1843–45), with its tower and spire, unlike his earlier churches was much closer to the Cambridge Camden Society's approach to church design. According to his son Alfred, Barry later disowned these early church designs of the 1820s and wished he could destroy them.

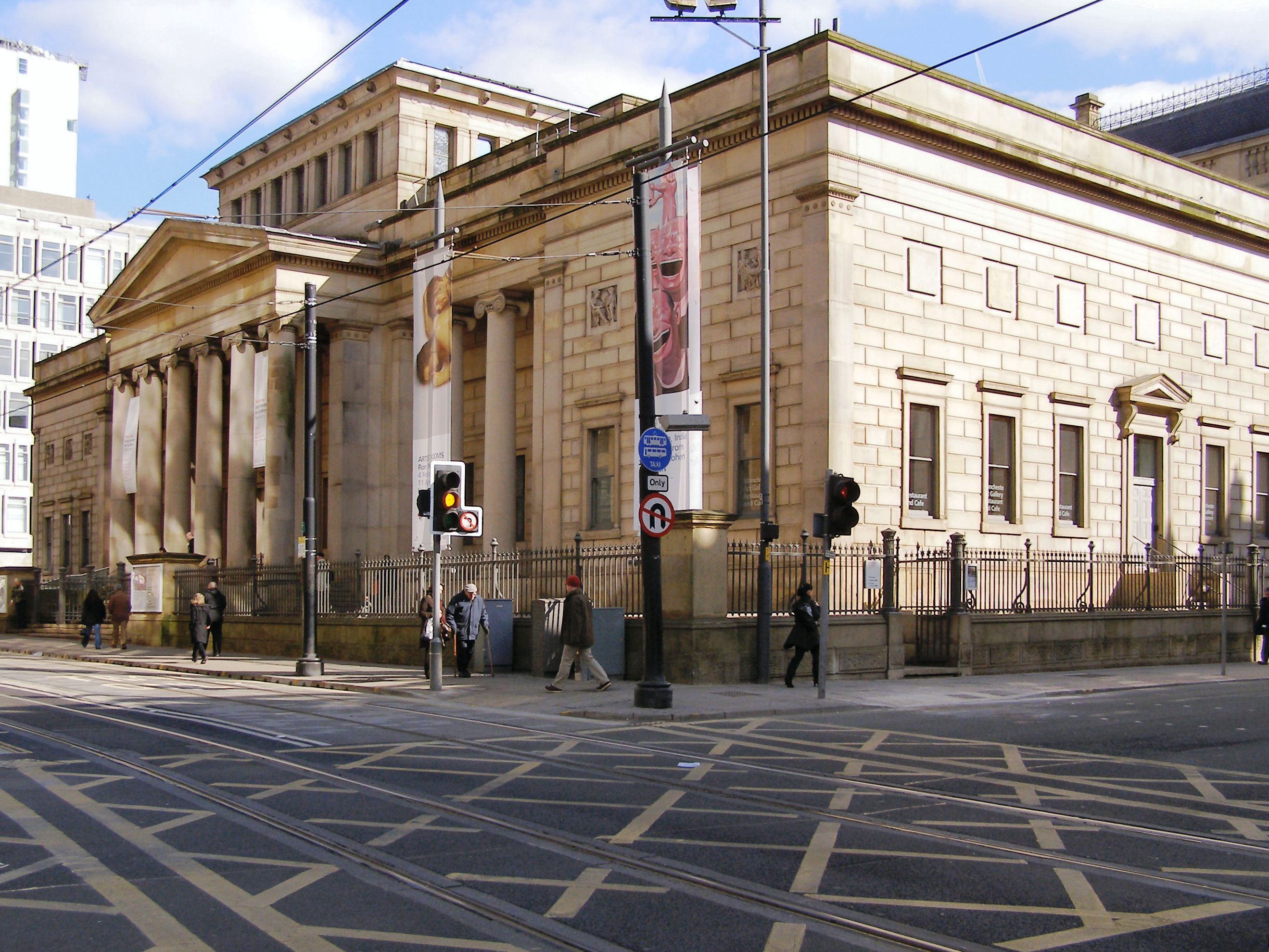
The Grade I-listed Manchester Art Gallery (1824) and the Grade II*-listed Athenaeum (1837) in Manchester

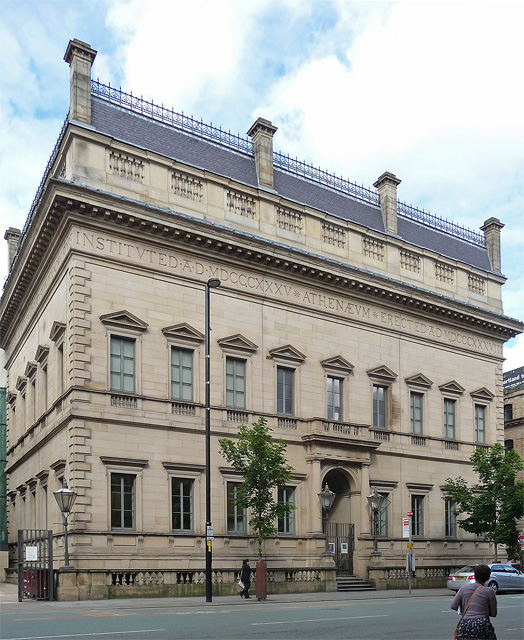

His first major civil commission came when he won a competition to design the new Royal Manchester Institution (1824–1835) for the promotion of literature, science and arts (now part of the Manchester Art Gallery), in Greek revival style, the only public building by Barry in that style. Also in north-west England, he designed Buile Hill House (1825) in Salford this is the only known house where Barry used Greek revival architecture. The Royal Sussex County Hospital was erected to Barry's design (1828) in a very plain classical style.

Thomas Attree's villa, Queen's Park, Brighton, the only one to be built of a series of villas designed for the area by Barry and the Pepper Pot (1830), whose original function was a water tower for the development. In 1831, he entered the competition for the design of Birmingham Town Hall, the design was based on an Ancient Greek temple of the Doric order, but it failed to win the competition.

The marked preference for Italian architecture, which he acquired during his travels showed itself in various important undertakings of his earlier years, the first significant example being the Travellers Club, in Pall Mall, built in 1832, as with all his urban commissions in this style the design was astylar. He designed the Gothic King Edward's School, New Street, Birmingham (1833–37), demolished 1936, it was during the erection of the school that Barry first met Augustus Welby Northmore Pugin, he helped Barry design the interiors of the building.

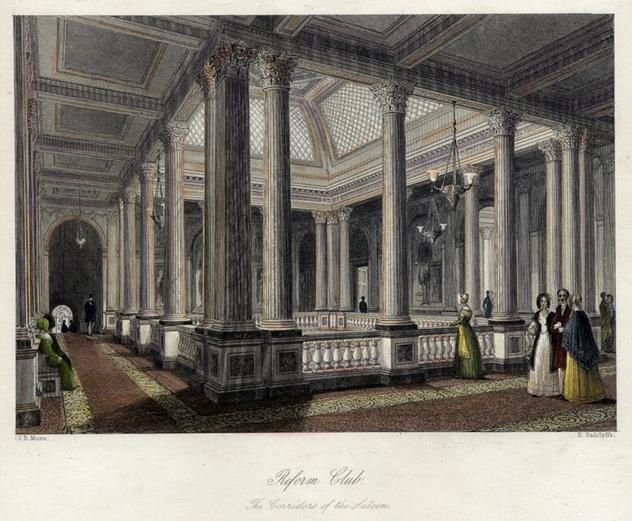
Saloon, Reform Club, London

His last work in Manchester was the Italianate Manchester Athenaeum (1837–39), this is now part of Manchester Art Gallery. From 1835–37, he rebuilt Royal College of Surgeons of England, in Lincoln's Inn Fields, Westminster, he preserved the Ionic portico from the earlier building (1806–13) designed by George Dance the Younger, the building has been further extended (1887–88) and (1937). In 1837, he won the competition to design the Reform Club, Pall Mall, London, which is one of his finest Italianate public buildings, notable for its double height central saloon with glazed roof. His favourite building in Rome, the Farnese Palace, influenced the design.

== Country house work ==
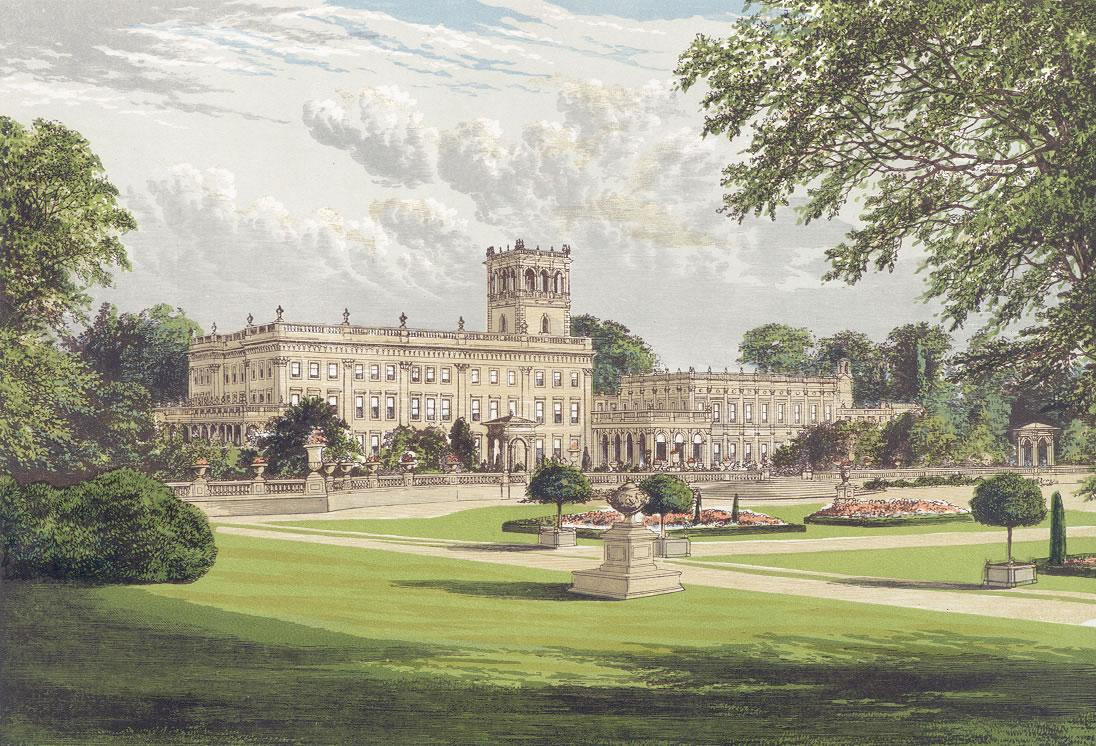
Trentham Hall, demolished

A major focus of his career was the remodelling of older country houses. His first major commission was the transformation of Henry Holland's Trentham Hall in Staffordshire, between 1834 and 1840. It was remodelled in the Italianate style with a large tower (a feature Barry often included in his country houses). Barry also designed the Italianate gardens, with parterres and fountains. Largely demolished in 1912, only a small portion of the house, consisting of the porte-cochère with a curving corridor, and the stables, are still standing, although the gardens are undergoing a restoration. Additionally, the belvedere from the top of the tower survives as a folly at Sandon Hall.

Between 1834 and 1838, at Bowood House, Wiltshire, owned by Henry Petty-Fitzmaurice, 3rd Marquess of Lansdowne, Barry added the tower, made alterations to the gardens, and designed the Italianate entrance lodge. For the same client, he designed the Lansdowne Monument in 1845. Walton House in Walton-on-Thames followed in 1835–39. Again Barry used the Italianate style, with a three-storey tower over the entrance porte-cochère (which was demolished 1973). Then, from 1835 to 1838, he remodelled Sir Roger Pratt's Kingston Lacy, with the exterior being re-clad in stone. The interiors were also Barry's work.

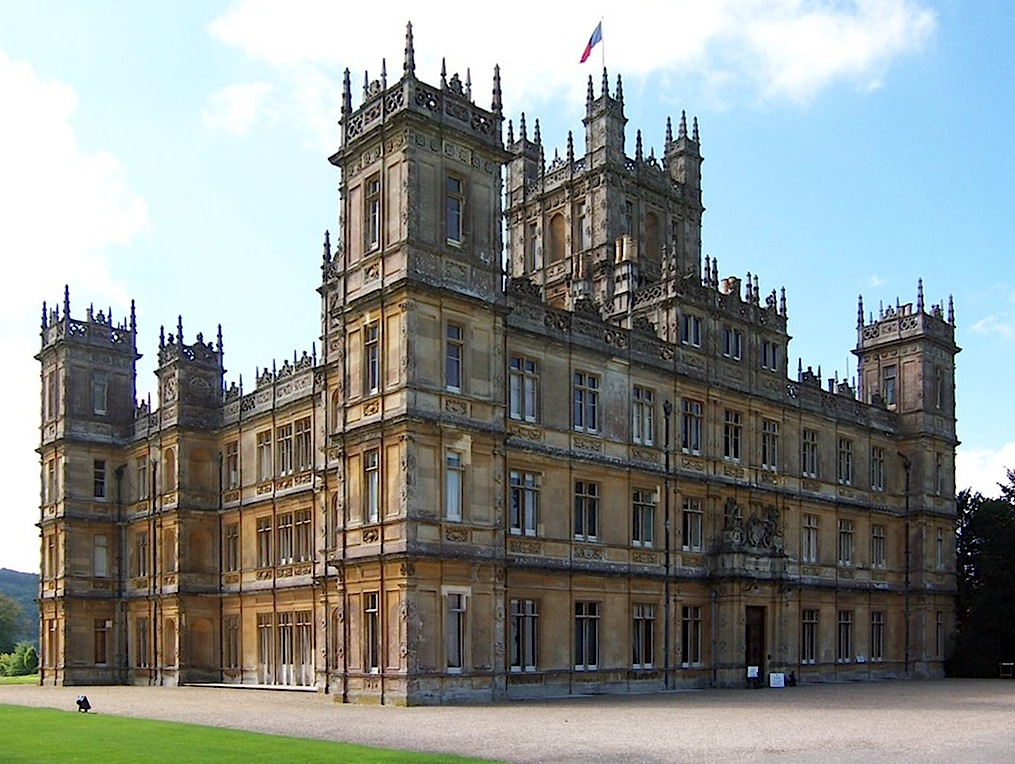
Highclere Castle, north front

Highclere Castle, Hampshire, with its large tower, was remodelled between about 1842 and 1850, in Elizabethan style, for Henry Herbert, 3rd Earl of Carnarvon. The building was completely altered externally, with the plain Georgian structure being virtually rebuilt. However, little of the interior is by Barry, because his patron died in 1849 and Thomas Allom completed the work in 1861. At Duncombe Park, Yorkshire, Barry designed new wings, which were added between in 1843 and 1846 in the English Baroque style of the main block. At Harewood House he remodelled the John Carr exterior between 1843 and 1850, adding an extra floor to the end pavilions, and replacing the portico on the south front with Corinthian pilasters. Some of the Robert Adam interiors were remodelled, with the dining room being entirely by Barry, and he created the formal terraces and parterres surrounding the house.

Between 1844 and 1848, Barry remodelled Dunrobin Castle, Sutherland, Scotland, in Scots Baronial Style, for George Sutherland-Leveson-Gower, 2nd Duke of Sutherland for whom he had remodelled Trentham Hall. Due to a fire in the early 20th century, little of Barry's interiors survive at Dunrobin, but the gardens, with their fountains and parterres, are also by Barry. Canford Manor, Dorset, was extended in a Tudor Gothic style between 1848 and 1852, including a large entrance tower. The most unusual interior is the Nineveh porch, built to house Assyrian sculptures from the eponymous palace, decorated with Assyrian motifs.

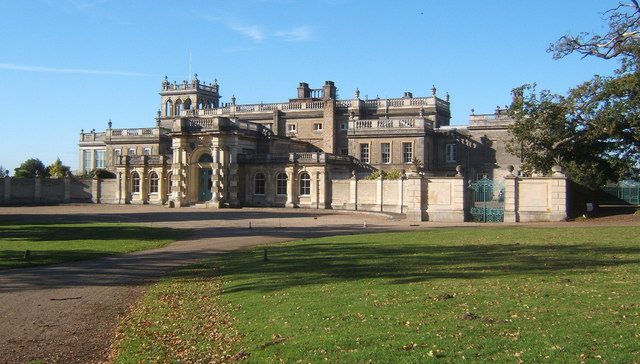
Shrubland Hall

James Paine's Shrubland Park was remodelled between 1849 and 1854, including an Italianate tower and entrance porch, a lower hall with Corinthian columns and glass domes, and impressive formal gardens based on Italian Renaissance gardens. The gardens included a 70-foot (21 m)-high series of terraces linked by a grand flight of steps, with an open temple structure at the top. Originally there were cascades of water either side of the staircase. The main terrace is at the centre of a string of gardens nearly 1 mile (1,600 m) in length.

Between 1850 and 1852, Barry remodelled Gawthorpe Hall, an Elizabethan house situated south-east of the small town of Padiham, in the borough of Burnley, Lancashire. It was originally a pele tower, built in the 14th century as a defence against the invading Scots. Around 1600, a Jacobean mansion had been dovetailed around the pele, but today's hall is re-design of the house, using the original Elizabethan style.

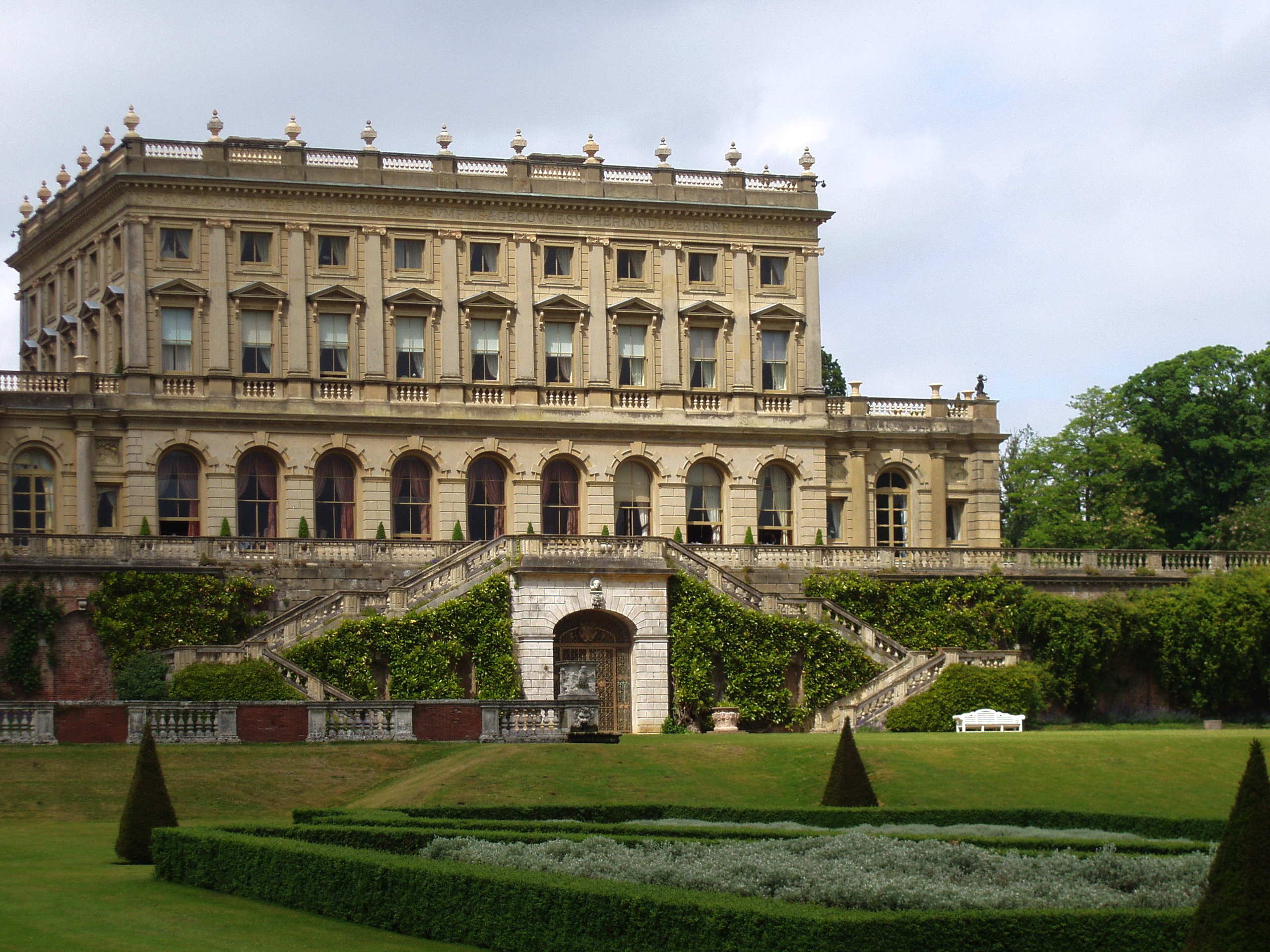
Cliveden House as seen from its lawn

Barry's last major remodelling work was Cliveden House, which had been the seat of the Earls of Orkney from 1696 till 1824. Barry's remodelling was again on behalf of the 2nd Duke of Sutherland. After the previous building was burnt down (1850–51), Barry built a new central block in the Italianate style, rising to three floors, the lowest of which have arch headed windows, and the upper two floors have giant Ionic pilasters. He also designed the parterres below the house. Little of Barry's interior design survived later remodelling.

== Later urban work ==
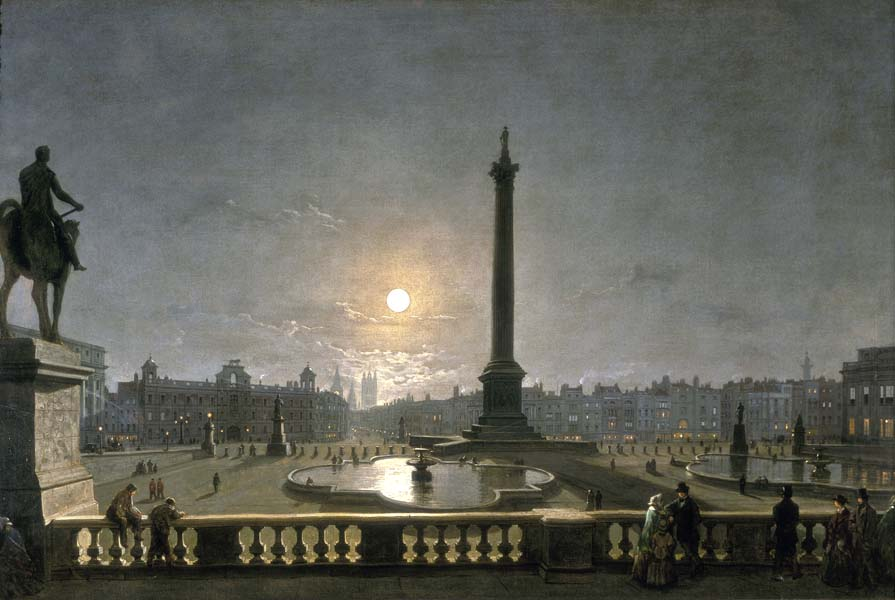
Trafalgar Square c. 1865, painted on Barry's terrace and showing Barry's Fountains

Barry remodelled Trafalgar Square (1840–45) he designed the north terrace with the steps at either end, and the sloping walls on the east and west of the square, the two fountain basins are also to Barry's design, although Edwin Lutyens re-designed the actual fountains (1939).

Barry was commissioned to design (1840–42) the façade of Pentonville prison, that was designed by Joshua Jebb, he added a stuccoed Italianate pilastered frontage to Caledonian Road. The (Old) Treasury (Now Cabinet Office) Whitehall by John Soane, built (1824–26) was virtually rebuilt by Barry (1844–47). It consists of 23 bays with a giant Corinthian order over a rusticated ground floor, the five bays at each end project slightly from the façade.

Bridgewater House, Westminster, London (1845–64) for Francis Egerton, 1st Earl of Ellesmere, in a grand Italianate style. The structure was complete by 1848, but interior decoration was only finished by 1864. The main (south) front is 144 feet long, of nine bays in more massive version of his earlier Reform Club, the garden (west) front is of seven bays. The interiors are intact apart from the north wing which was bombed in The Blitz. The main interior is the central Saloon, a roofed courtyard of two storeys, of three by five bays of arches on each floor, the walls are lined with scagliola, the coved ceiling is glazed and the centre has three glazed saucer domes. The decoration of the major rooms is not the work of Barry.

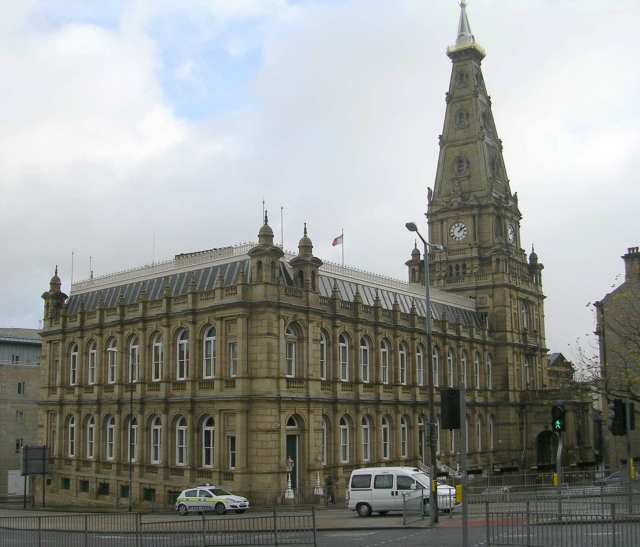
Halifax Town Hall

The last major commission of Barry's was Halifax Town Hall (1859–62), in a North Italian Cinquecento style, and a grand tower with spire, the interior includes a central hall similar to that at Bridgewater House, the building was completed after Barry's death by his son Edward Middleton Barry.

Completed after Barry's death in 1863 was the classical, Guest Memorial Reading Room and Library in Dowlais, Wales.

The most significant of Barry's designs that were not carried out included, his proposed Law Courts (1840–41), that if built would have covered Lincoln's Inn Fields with a large Greek Revival building, this rectangular building would have been over three hundred by four hundred feet, in a Greek Doric style, there would have been octastyle porticoes in the middle of the shorter sides and hexastyle porticoes on the longer sides, leading to a large central hall that would have been surrounded by twelve court rooms that in turn were surrounded by the ancillary facilities. Later was his General Scheme of Metropolitan Improvements, that were exhibited in 1857. This comprehensive scheme was for the redevelopment of much of Whitehall, Horse Guards Parade, the embankment of the River Thames on both sides of the river in the areas to the north and south of the Palace of Westminster, this would eventual be partially realised as the Victoria Embankment and Albert Embankment, three new bridges across the Thames, a vast Hotel where Charing Cross railway station was later built, the enlargement of the National Gallery (Barry's son Edward would later extend the Gallery) and new buildings around Trafalgar Square and along the new embankments and the recently created Victoria Street. There were also several new roads proposed on both sides of the Thames. The largest of the proposed buildings would have been even larger than the Palace of Westminster, this was the Government Offices, this vast building would have covered the area stretching from horse Guards Parade across Downing Street and the sites of the future Foreign and Commonwealth Office and the HM Treasury on Whitehall up to Parliament Square. It would have had a vast glass-roofed hall, 320 by 150 feet, at the centre of the building. The plan was to house all government departments apart from the Admiralty in the building. The building would have been in a Classical style incorporating Barry's existing Treasury building.

== Houses of Parliament ==
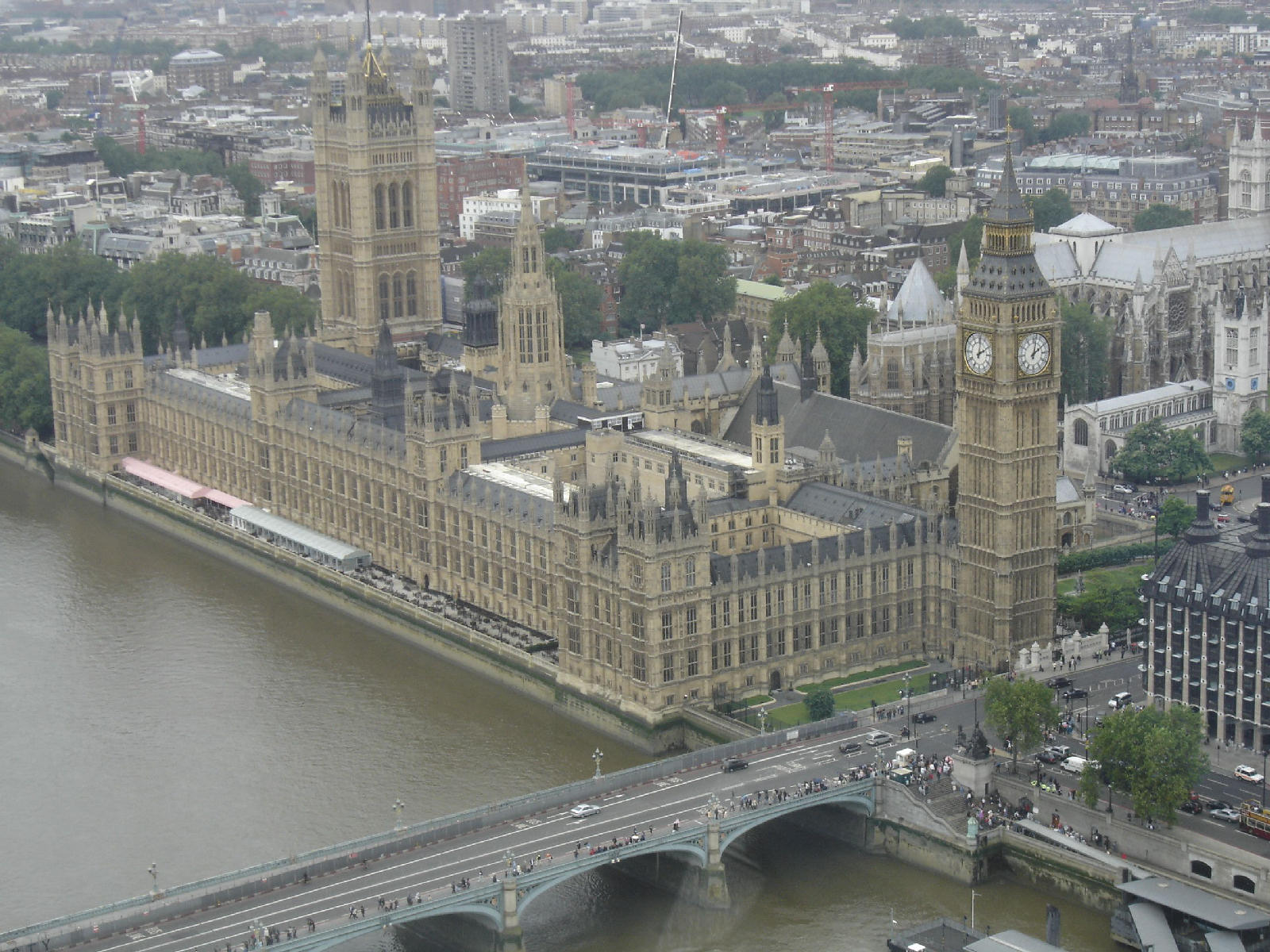
Aerial view, Palace of Westminster

Following the destruction by fire of the old Houses of Parliament on 16 October 1834, a competition was held to find a suitable design, for which there were 97 entries. Barry's entry, number 64, for which Augustus Pugin helped prepare the competition drawings, won the commission in January 1836 to design the new Palace of Westminster. His collaboration with Pugin, who designed furniture, stained glass, sculpture, wallpaper, decorative floor tiles and mosaic work, was not renewed until June 1844, and then continued until Pugin's mental breakdown and death in 1852. The Tudor Gothic architectural style was chosen to complement the Henry VII Lady Chapel opposite. The design had to incorporate those parts of the building that escaped destruction, most notably Westminster Hall, the adjoining double-storey cloisters of St Stephen's court and the crypt of St Stephen's Chapel. Barry's design was parallel to the River Thames, but the surviving buildings were at a slight angle to the river, so Barry had to incorporate the awkwardly different axes into the design. Although the design included most of the elements of the finished building, including the two towers at either end of the building, it would undergo significant redesign. The winning design was only about 650 feet (200 m) in length, about two-thirds the size of the finished building. The central lobby and tower were later additions, as was the extensive royal suite at the southern end of the building. The amended design on which construction commenced was approximately the same size as the finished building, although both the Victoria Tower and Clock Tower were considerably taller in the finished building, and the Central Tower was not yet part of the design.

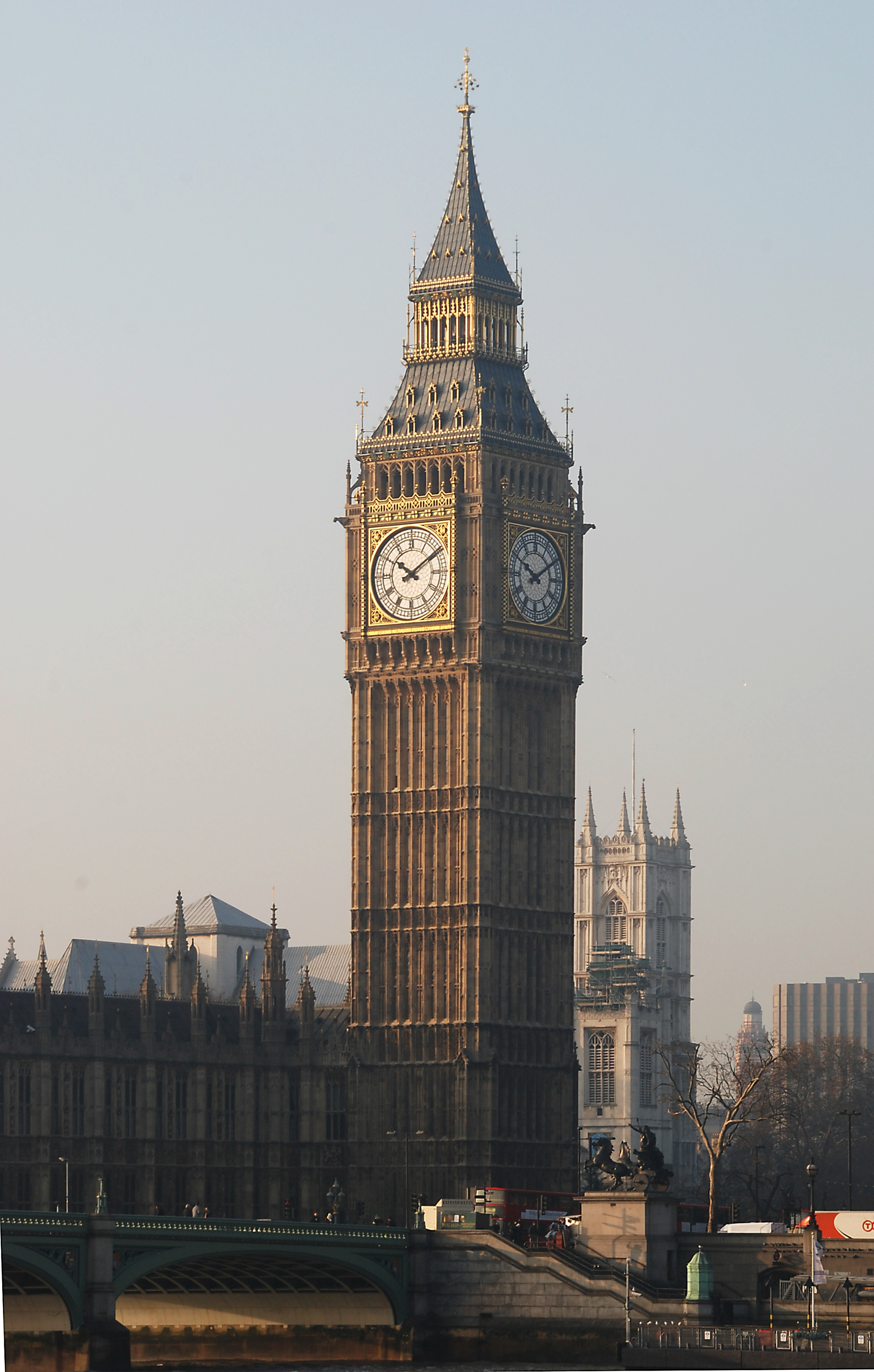
Elizabeth Tower of the Palace of Westminster, Barry's most famous building (though designed by Pugin).

Before construction could commence, the site had to be embanked and cleared of the remains of the previous buildings, and various sewers needed to be diverted. On 1 September 1837, work started on building a 920-foot (280 m) long coffer-dam to enclose the building site along the river. The construction of the embankment started on New Year's Day 1839. The first work consisted of the construction of a vast concrete raft to serve as the building's foundation. After the space had been excavated by hand, 70,000 cubic yards (54,000 m^{3}) of concrete were laid. The site of the Victoria Tower was found to consist of quicksand, necessitating the use of piles. The stone selected for the exterior of the building was quarried at Anston in Yorkshire, with the core of the walls being laid in brick. To make the building as fire-proof as possible, wood was only used decoratively, rather than structurally, and extensive use was made of cast iron. The roofs of the building consist of cast iron girders covered by sheets of iron, cast iron beams were also used as joists to support the floors and extensively in the internal structures of both the clock tower and Victoria tower.

Barry and his engineer Alfred Meeson were responsible for designing scaffolding, hoists and cranes used in the construction. One of their most innovative developments was the scaffolding used to construct the three main towers. For the central tower they designed an inner rotating scaffold, surrounded by timber centring to support the masonry vault of the Central Lobby, that spans 57 feet 2 inches (17.42 m), and an external timber tower. A portable steam engine was used to lift stone and brick to the upper parts of the tower. When it came to building the Victoria and Clock towers, it was decided to dispense with external scaffolding and lift building materials up through the towers by an internal scaffolding that travelled up the structure as it was built. The scaffold and cranes were powered by steam engines.

Work on the actual building began with the laying of a foundation stone on 27 April 1840 by Barry's wife Sarah, near the north-east corner of the building. A major problem for Barry came with the appointment on 1 April 1840 of the ventilation expert Dr David Boswell Reid. Reid, whom Barry said was "...not profess to be thoroughly acquainted with the practical details of building and machinery...", would make increasing demands that affected the building's design, leading to delays in construction. By 1845, Barry was refusing to communicate with Reid except in writing. A direct result of Reid's demands was the addition of the Central Tower, designed to act as a giant chimney to draw fresh air through the building.

The House of Lords was completed in April 1847 in the form of a double cube measuring 90 ft × 45 ft × 45 ft (27 m × 14 m × 14 m). The House of Commons was finished in 1852, where later Barry would be created a Knight Bachelor. The Elizabeth Tower, which houses the great clock and bells including Big Ben, is 316 feet (96 m) tall and was completed in 1858. The Victoria Tower is 323 feet (98 m) tall and was completed in 1860. The iron flagpole on the Victoria Tower tapers from 2 feet 9 inches (840 mm) in diameter and the iron crown on top is 3 feet 6 inches (1,070 mm) in diameter and 395 feet (120 m) above ground. The central tower is 261 feet (80 m) high. The building is 940 feet (290 m) long, covers about 8 acres (3 hectares) of land, and has over 1000 rooms. The east Thames façade is 873 feet (266 m) in length. Pugin later dismissed the building, saying "All Grecian, Sir, Tudor details on a classic body", the essentially symmetrical plan and river front being offensive to Pugin's taste for medieval Gothic buildings.

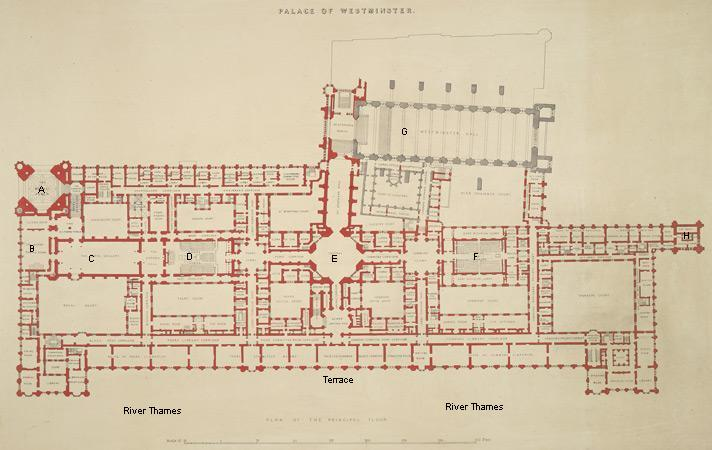
Plan of the main (first) floor, Palace of Westminster

The plan of the finished building is built around two major axes. At the southern end of Westminster Hall, St. Stephen's porch was created as a major entrance to the building. This involved inserting a great arch with a grand staircase at the southern end of Westminster hall, which leads to the first floor where the major rooms are located. To the east of St. Stephens porch is St. Stephen's Hall, built on the surviving undercroft of St. Stephen's Chapel. To the east of this the octagonal Central Lobby (above which is the central tower), the centre of the building. North of the Central Lobby is the Commons' Corridor which leads into the square Commons' Lobby, north of which is the House of Commons.

There are various offices and corridors to the north of the House of Commons with the clock tower terminating the northern axis of the building. South of the Central Lobby is the Peers' Corridor leading to the Peers' Lobby, south of which lies the House of Lords. South of the House of Lords in sequence are the Prince's Chamber, Royal Gallery, and Queen's Robing Room. To the north-west of the Queen's Robing Chamber is the Norman Porch, to the west of which the Royal Staircase leads down to the Royal Entrance located immediately beneath the Victoria Tower. East of the Central Lobby is the East Corridor leading to the Lower Waiting Hall, to the east of which is the Members Dining Room located in the very centre of the east front. To the north of the Members Dining Room lies the House of Commons Library, and at the northern end of the east front is the projecting Speaker's House, home of the Speaker of the House of Commons. To the south of the Members Dining Room lies various committee rooms followed by House of Lords Library. Projecting from the southern end of the façade is the Lord Chancellor's House, home of the Lord Chancellor.

Although Parliament gave Barry a prestigious name in architecture, it nearly finished him off. Completion of the building was very overdue; Barry had estimated it would take six years and cost £724,986 (excluding the cost of the site, embankment and furnishings). However, construction actually took 26 years, and it was also well over budget; by July 1854 the estimated cost was £2,166,846. Those pressures left Barry tired and stressed. The full Barry design was never completed; it would have enclosed New Palace Yard as an internal courtyard, and the clock tower would have been in the north-east corner, with a great gateway in the north-west corner surmounted by the Albert Tower, continuing south along the west front of Westminster Hall.

== Professional life ==
Barry was appointed architect to the Dulwich College estate in 1830, an appointment that last until 1858. Barry attended the inaugural meeting of the Royal Institute of British Architects on 3 December 1834 he became a fellow of the R.I.B.A. and later served as vice-president of the institute, in 1859 he turned down the Presidency of the R.I.B.A. In 1845 he awarded the commission in the competition for New College, Edinburgh to William Henry Playfair. Barry also served on the Royal Commission (learned committee) developing plans for the Great Exhibition of 1851; also in 1851, he was a co-founder of what became the Royal Architectural Museum. In 1852 he was an assessor on the committee that selected Cuthbert Brodrick's design in the competition to design Leeds Town Hall. In 1853 Barry was consulted by Albert, Prince Consort on his plans for creation of what became known as Albertopolis. Barry spent two months in Paris in 1855 representing, along with his friend and fellow architect Charles Robert Cockerell, English architecture on the juries of the Exposition Universelle.

Barry was an active fellow of the Royal Academy, and he was involved in revising the architectural curriculum in 1856. In 1858 Barry was appointed to the St. Paul's Committee, whose function was to oversee the maintenance of the Special Evening Service in St Paul's Cathedral and carry out redecoration of the cathedral.

Several architects received their training in Barry's office, including: John Hayward, John Gibson, George Somers Leigh Clarke, J. A. Chatwin and his sons Charles Barry and Edward Middleton Barry. Additionally Barry had several assistants who worked for him at various times, including Robert Richardson Banks, Thomas Allom, Peter Kerr and Ingress Bell.

== Awards and recognition ==
- Barry was elected Associate of the Royal Academy on 2 November 1840
- On 10 February 1842 Barry was elected a Royal Academician of the Royal Academy, his diploma work being a drawing of the south front of the Travellers Club.
- He was recognised by the main artistic bodies of many European countries, and was enrolled as a member of the academies of art in Rome (Accademia di San Luca) in 1842, Saint Petersburg (Imperial Academy of Arts) (1845), Brussels (Royal Academy of Fine Arts) (1847), Berlin (Prussian Academy of Arts) (1849) and Stockholm, (Royal Swedish Academy of Fine Arts) (1850). He was later elected to the Royal Danish Academy of Fine Arts.
- Elected a Fellow of the Royal Society in 1849.
- Awarded the RIBA Royal Gold Medal in 1850, it was presented to him on 3 June by Thomas de Grey, 2nd Earl de Grey, the president of the institute.
- Barry was knighted in 1852 by Queen Victoria at Windsor Castle, marking the completion of the main interiors of the Palace of Westminster.
- After the foundation of the American Institute of Architects in 1857 Barry was elected a member.
- A London County Council blue plaque, unveiled in 1950, commemorates Barry at "The Elms", his house by Clapham Common.

== Personal life and family ==
Barry disliked being away from London. Not liking life in the country, he preferred the bustle and society of the city. He was an early riser, usually between four and six o'clock in the morning; he only needed four or five hours sleep. He preferred to do his thinking and designing in the morning, but was happy to have company while at work, liking to read to or join in conversation. He had a dislike of public display, considering it hollow and lacking in conviction. His general disposition was sanguine, though he had a quick temper. He preferred science to literature, he frequently attended the Friday night lectures held at the Royal Institution.

Barry was engaged to Sarah Rowsell (1798–1882) in 1817, they married on 7 December 1822 and had seven children together.

Four of Sir Charles Barry's five sons followed in his career footsteps. Eldest son Charles Barry (junior) (1823–1900) designed Dulwich College and park in south London and rebuilt Burlington House (home of the Royal Academy) in central London's Piccadilly; Edward Middleton Barry (1830–1880) completed the Parliament buildings and designed the Royal Opera House in Covent Garden; Godfrey Walter Barry (1833–1868) became a surveyor; Sir John Wolfe-Barry (1836–1918) was the engineer for Tower Bridge and Blackfriars Railway Bridge. Edward and Charles also collaborated on the design of the Great Eastern Hotel at London's Liverpool Street station.

His second son, Rev. Alfred Barry (1826–1910), became a noted clergyman. He was headmaster of Leeds Grammar School from 1854 to 1862 and of Cheltenham College from 1862 to 1868. He later became the third Bishop of Sydney, Australia. He wrote a 400-page biography of his father, The Life and Times of Sir Charles Barry, R.A., F.R.S., that was published in 1867.

Barry's daughters were Emily Barry (1828–1886) and Adelaide Sarah Barry (1841–1907).

Sir Charles' relative John Hayward designed several buildings including, The Hall, Chapel Quad Pembroke College, Oxford.

Two of Barry's grandsons continued in the profession, Charles Edward Barry (1855–1937) architect and assistant to his father, and his brother Lt Col Arthur John Barry (1859–1943), civil engineer and architect, son of Charles Barry Jr. and pupil and later partner of Sir John Wolfe-Barry. He was the author of Railway Expansion in China and the Influence of Foreign Powers in Its Development (London, 1910) and is noted for significant infrastructure projects in India, China, Thailand and Egypt. He was the final generation of the Barry architectural and engineering dynasty.

Members of the Barry Family in Practice	Dates	Profession
Sir Charles Barry	1795–1860	Architect
Charles Barry Jr.	1823–1900	Architect
Edward Middleton Barry	1830–1880	Architect
Godfrey Walter Barry	1833–1868	Surveyor
Sir John Wolfe-Barry	1836–1918	Civil Engineer
Charles Edward Barry	1855–1937	Architect
Lt Col Arthur John Barry	1859–1943	Civil Engineer

== Death and funeral ==
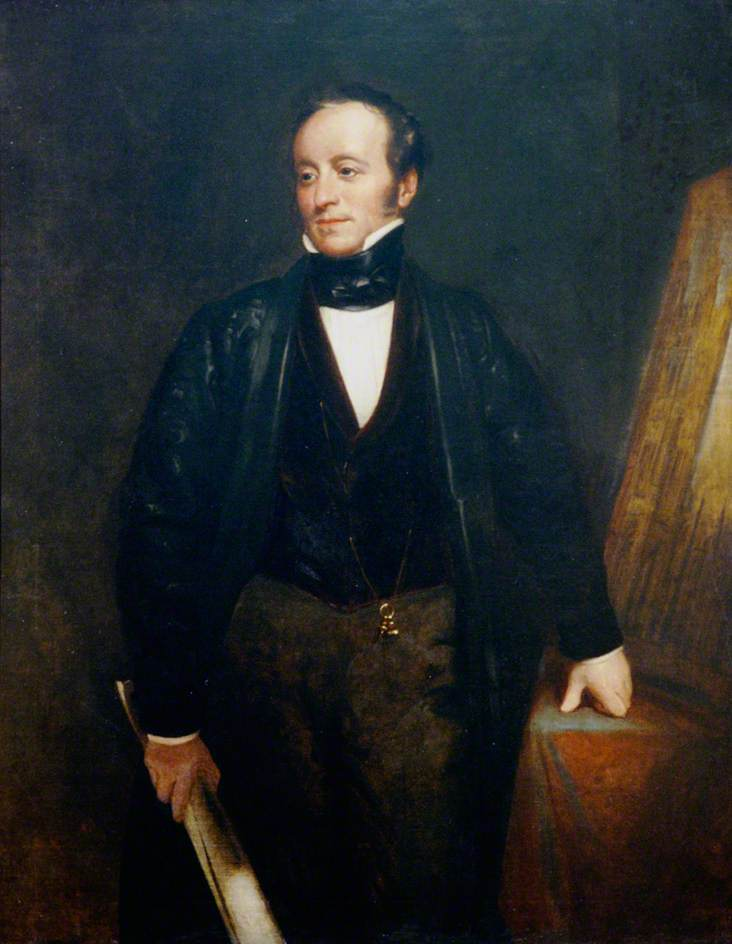
Charles Barry by Henry William Pickersgill

From onward 1837 Barry suffered from sudden bouts of illness, one of the most severe being in 1858. On 12 May 1860 after an afternoon at the Crystal Palace with Lady Barry, at his home The Elms, Clapham Common, he was seized at eleven o'clock at night with difficulty in breathing and was in pain from a heart attack and died shortly after.

His funeral and interment took place at one o'clock on 22 May in Westminster Abbey, the cortège formed at Vauxhall Bridge, there were eight pall-bearers: Sir Charles Eastlake; William Cowper-Temple, 1st Baron Mount Temple; George Parker Bidder; Sir Edward Cust, 1st Baronet; Alexander Beresford Hope; the Dean of St. Paul's Henry Hart Milman; Charles Robert Cockerell and Sir William Tite. There were several hundred mourners at the funeral service, including his five sons, (it was against custom for women to attend, so neither his widow or daughters were present), his friend Mr Wolfe, numerous members of the House of Commons and Lords, attended, several who were his former clients, about 150 members of the R.I.B.A., including: Decimus Burton, Thomas Leverton Donaldson, Benjamin Ferrey, Charles Fowler, George Godwin, Owen Jones, Henry Edward Kendall, John Norton, Joseph Paxton, James Pennethorne, Anthony Salvin, Sydney Smirke, Lewis Vulliamy, Matthew Digby Wyatt and Thomas Henry Wyatt. Various members of the Royal Society, Royal Academy, Institution of Civil Engineers, Society for the Encouragement of the Fine Arts and Society of Antiquaries of London were present. The funeral service was taken by the Dean of Westminster Abbey Richard Chenevix Trench.

Hardman & Co. made the monumental brass marking Barry's tomb in the nave at Westminster Abbey shows the Victoria Tower and Plan of the Palace of Westminster flanking a large Christian cross bearing representations of the Paschal Lamb and the four Evangelists and on the stem are roses, leaves, a portcullis and the letter B., beneath is this inscription:

Sacred to the memory of Sir Charles Barry, Knight R.A. F.R.S. & c. Architect of the New Palace of Westminster and other buildings who died the 12th May A.D. 1860 aged 64 years and lies buried beneath this brass.

The brass has this inscription running around its edge:

Whatsoever ye do do it heartily as to the Lord and not unto Men for ye serve the Lord Christ. Col. Colossians III.23.24.

The following tribute was paid by the R.I.B.A.:

The Royal Institute of British Architects impressed with the loss which the profession and the country have sustained through the decease of Sir Charles Barry, whose genius has conferred great lustre upon this age, hereby record their profound sympathy with the affliction which has fallen upon the widow and family of their lamented friend.

Following Barry's death a life size white-marble sculpture (1861–65) of him was carved by John Henry Foley and was set up as a memorial to him at the foot of the Committee Stairs in the Palace of Westminster.

== Major projects ==
Barry designed:

- St. Mary the Virgin's Church, Bylaugh, Norfolk (1809)
- Remodelling of Soughton Hall under the instructions of travelling companion William John Bankes (1820s)
- All Saints' Church, Whitefield (1822–25)
- St Matthew's Church, Manchester (1825)
- St Peter's Church, Brighton (1824–28)
- The Royal Institution of Fine Arts, Manchester, now Manchester Art Gallery (1824–35)
- St Paul's Church, Islington (1826–28)
- St John, Holloway Road, Islington (1826–28)
- Holy Trinity, Cloudesley Square, Islington (1826–29)
- New tower Petworth Church, and remodelled staircase balustrade, Petworth House, Sussex (1827)
- The Royal Sussex County Hospital, Brighton (1828)
- Thomas Attree's villa and the Pepper Pot, Queen's Park, Brighton (1830)
- Travellers Club. Pall Mall, London (1830–32)
- Remodelling Dulwich College largely destroyed when rebuilt by Charles Barry Jr. (1831)
- The Royal College of Surgeons, (the portico survives from George Dance the Younger's building) London (1834–36)
- Horsley Towers, Surrey (1834)
- St Peter's Church, Islington (1834-35; converted into flats circa 1990)
- New gateway and entrance lodge plus alterations to the gardens Bowood House, Wiltshire (1834–38)
- Remodelling of Kingston Lacy, Dorset (1835–39)
- The Manchester Athenaeum (1837–39 – now also part of the Manchester Art Gallery)
- The Reform Club, London (1837 – next door to the Travellers)
- King Edward's School, New Street, Birmingham (1838)
- Lancaster House, London, interiors (1838–40)
- Upper Brook Street Chapel, Manchester (1837–39)
- The Trafalgar Square precinct (1840)
- Pentonville, London, architectural features, overall design by Joshua Jebb (1841–42)
- Old Grammar School at the College of God’s Gift at Dulwich (established for the education of poor boys from Dulwich and Camberwell, constructed 1841–42)
- Remodelling of Trentham Hall and creation of its Italianate gardens, north Staffordshire (1842)
- Remodelling (virtual rebuilding) of Highclere Castle, Hampshire (1842)
- Added wings and other remodelling, Duncombe Park, Yorkshire (1843–46)
- Holy Trinity Church, Hurstpierpoint, Sussex (1843–45)
- Remodelling of Harewood House, Yorkshire (1843–50)
- Lansdowne Monument, Cherhill, Wiltshire (1845)
- The former Treasury now the Cabinet Office building in Whitehall (the remodelling of an earlier building br Sir John Soane) (1846–47)
- Bridgewater House, Westminster, London (1846–51)
- Canford Manor in Tudor Gothic, now Canford School, Dorset (1848–52)
- Cliveden House in Buckinghamshire (1850–51)
- Remodelling of Dunrobin Castle near Golspie, Scotland (1850)
- Remodelling of Kiddington Hall, Oxfordshire (1850)
- Remodelling of Shrubland Park and Italianate gardens, Suffolk (1850)
- Barristers' chambers at 1 Temple Gardens in Inner Temple
- Restoration of Gawthorpe Hall, near Burnley, Lancashire (1850–52)
- Halifax Town Hall, West Yorkshire (designed 1860; completed by Edward Middleton Barry, 1863)
