= Portrait of Charles Barry =

Painting by John Prescott Knight

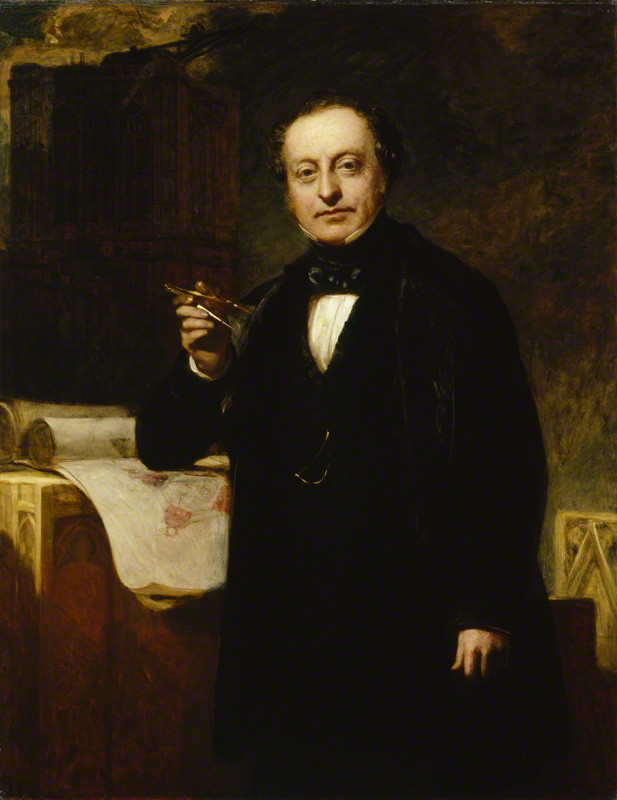
- Artist: John Prescott Knight
- Year: c 1851
- Type: Oil on canvas, portrait painting
- Dimensions: 144.7 cm × 111.7 cm (57.0 in × 44.0 in)
- Location: National Portrait Gallery, London

Portrait of Charles Barry is an 1851 portrait painting by the British artist John Prescott Knight. It depicts the English architect Charles Barry, best known for his design for the Palace of Westminster, rebuilt after the fire of 1834. Barry worked on a number of other projects. He was one of the Commissioners for the Great Exhibition around the time the picture was painted. He is shown holding a Compass resting his arm on some Gothic architectural plans, against the backdrop of part of the Houses of Parliament.

Prescott Knight was a prominent portraitist of the early Victorian era. The work was displayed at the Royal Academy Exhibition of 1851 at the National Gallery. Today it is in the collection of the adjacent National Portrait Gallery, having been gifted by Barry's son in 1900.

== See also ==
- The Royal Commissioners for the Exhibition of 1851 by Henry Wyndham Phillips, a group portrait featuring Barry

== Bibliography ==
- Ormond, Richard. Early Victorian Portraits: Text. H.M. Stationery Office, 1974.
- Yorke, James. Lancaster House: London's Greatest Town House. Merrell, 2001.
