= Pepper Pot, Brighton =

Pepper Pot
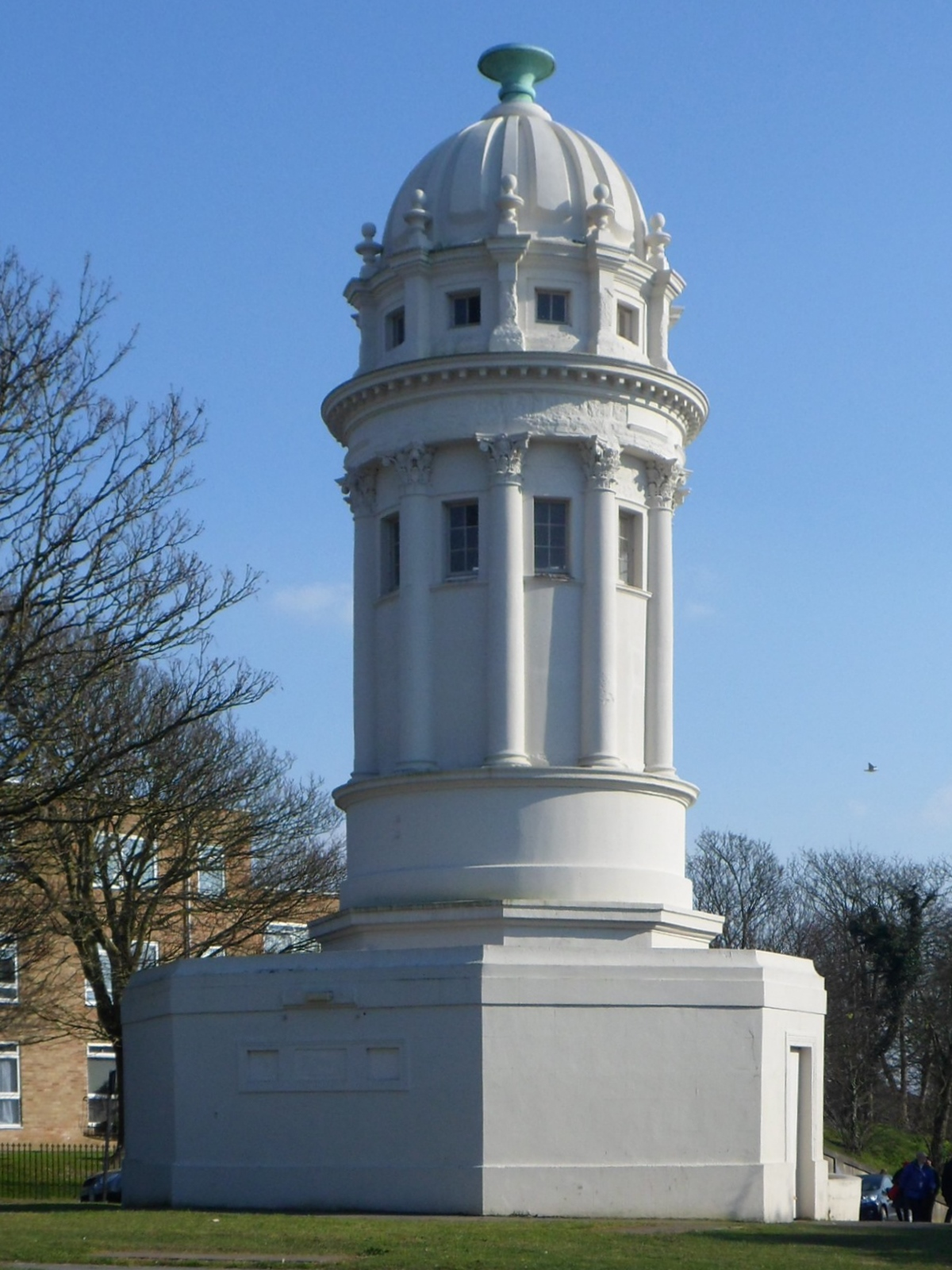
- The building from the west

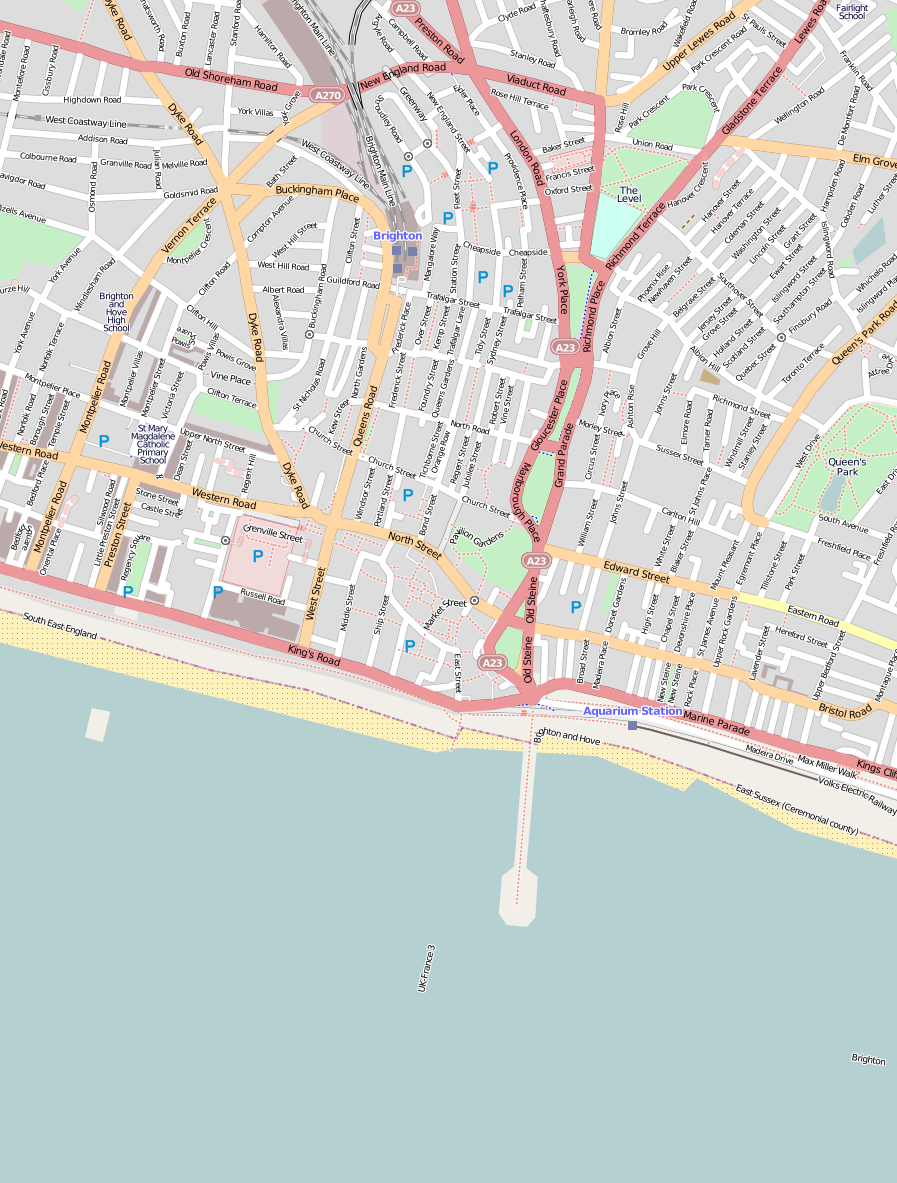
- Location of the Pepper Pot within central Brighton
- 50.8272°N 0.1247°W
- Location: Tower Road, Queen's Park, Brighton, City of Brighton and Hove, England

History
- Built: 1830
- Built for: Thomas Attree

Site notes
- Architect: Charles Barry
- Architectural style: Classical
- Restored: 2011
- Restored by: Brighton and Hove City Council
- Governing body: Brighton and Hove City Council

Listed Building – Grade II
- Official name: The Tower or Pepper Pot
- Designated: 13 October 1952
- Reference no.: 1381031

The Pepper Pot, also known as the Pepperpot, originally called the Pepper Box and sometimes called The Tower, is a listed building in the Queen's Park area of the English city of Brighton and Hove. It was designed and built in 1830 by architect Charles Barry in the grounds of a villa, which was built for the owner of Queen's Park. It survived the villa's demolition and is now one of its only surviving remnants. Its original purpose is unknown, but several possible explanations have been given for its construction. It has had a wide variety of uses in the 20th century, and is now owned by Brighton and Hove City Council, protected as a Grade II listed building.

== History ==
Queen's Park was designed and laid out in 1824 in the east of Brighton, which had developed as a fashionable resort over the previous century as it developed a reputation as a healthy spa town patronised by the Prince Regent, other members of the British royal family and high society in general. In 1825, Thomas Attree—a property owner and developer in this part of Brighton—bought the park (at that stage known as Brighton Park) from its first owner, and employed architect Charles Barry to design a villa for him on the edge of the park. The Attree Villa, as it became known, stood in substantial grounds north of the park and was one of the earliest Italianate buildings in England. Barry designed the square building in the Quattrocento style; it was intended to be one of several around the park, but no more were built. Between 1909 and 1966 it was a Xaverian Roman Catholic college, but it fell into disrepair and was demolished in 1972 despite being a Grade II* listed building.

Few structural elements of the villa remain, but the Pepper Pot—which originally stood in the western part of the grounds—remains intact. It was built at the same time as the villa, but its original function is uncertain: theories include a water tower for the villa, a vent for the network of large Victorian sewers beneath Brighton, an observatory or even a folly. Research in 2011, based on a record in the Arcana of Science and Art (published in 1836), suggested that the tower stood above a well and housed a steam engine which drew the water out. Its name was given in the Arcana as "Belvedere Tower." Its present name, which has historically been used locally and has now been adopted more generally, makes reference to its shape.

Since it passed out of Attree's ownership, the structure has had a remarkable variety of uses. George Duddell bought Attree's estate in 1863, and used the Pepper Pot to print and publish his local newspaper, the Brighton Daily Mail. Three years later, it (along with the park, the villa and all associated buildings) had passed to the Brighton Corporation, the municipal forerunner of the present city council. During World War II, the military used the 60-foot (18 m) structure as an observation post. Later uses included the headquarters of a Scout troop, an artist's studio and—after an extension was built in the base in the 1960s—a public toilet.

The Pepper Pot was designated a Grade II listed building on 13 October 1952.

== Architecture ==
The Pepper Pot is a ten-sided, cylindrical structure, 60 feet (18 m) tall and standing on an octagonal base. It is topped by a cupola and a green metal urn. There are 11 Corinthian columns around the exterior. The tower rises in four stages. The lowest is the octagonal plinth which was extended to the north in the 1960s when toilets were installed. The short second stage is circular; its upper boundary is defined by a cornice. The columns extend all the way up the third stage; at the top of this section, between each column, is a small window. An entablature and cornice rest on top of the column and marks the division with the uppermost stage, which has 11 pilasters directly above the columns. Another entablature sits between the pilasters and the circular cupola.

The design is based on the Choragic Monument of Lysicrates in Athens, which was widely copied by British neoclassical architects.

The main building material was said to be cement by English Heritage in its listing description, but research undertaken during the 2011 restoration work discovered that the core of the Pepper Pot is made of a pioneering type of concrete known as "Ranger's Artificial Stone" or "Ranger's Lime Concrete"—making it one of the oldest buildings in England to use this material. William Ranger, a builder from the nearby village of Ringmer, invented this in the early 19th century.

== Restoration plans ==
The Friends of the Pepperpot group was formed in January 2010 to promote the conservation of the Pepperpot and try to get it back into use. In May 2011, Brighton and Hove City Council undertook a £50,000 restoration of the exterior. In the same month, the Friends of the Pepperpot announced that three new uses were being considered for the building—conversion into a bed and breakfast, a community centre or a café—and that they were in negotiations with the city council about the possibility of taking over the ownership of the building. In September 2011, it was stated that more structural work was needed and that the final cost could be £100,000, or even more if the interior was restored. Heritage bodies such as English Heritage, The Georgian Group, The Regency Society and The Landmark Trust consulted with the Friends of the Pepperpot and the city council to decide what should happen.

== See also ==
- Grade II listed buildings in Brighton and Hove: P–R
- The Pepperbox, also named for its shape

Media related to Pepper Pot, Brighton at Wikimedia Commons
