= Edward Knight (English actor) =

English actor

Edward Knight (1774–1826) was an English actor, commonly known as "Little Knight".

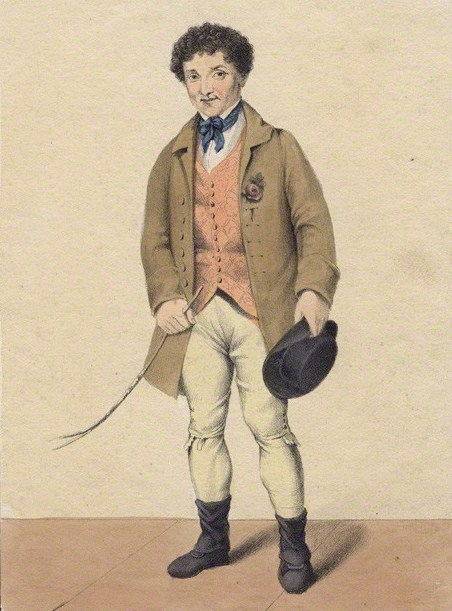
Edward Knight, 1822 lithograph

== Early life ==
He was born in Birmingham. While working as a sign-painter or artist, he saw a performance of a provincial company. He appeared onstage at Newcastle, Staffordshire, as Hob in Hob in the Well (Colley Cibber), but suffered stage-fright and ran off the stage. A year later at Raither in North Wales he got through the same part. Playing Frank Oatland in A Cure for the Heartache (Thomas Morton) he was seen and engaged by Nunns, the manager of the Stafford Theatre; and he worked in Stafford for some years. Tate Wilkinson, to whom he introduced himself, engaged him for the York circuit around 1803. His reception was favourable.

Knight was the author of a musical farce in two acts, entitled The Sailor and Soldier, or Fashionable Amusement. It was produced for his benefit in Kingston upon Hull in 1805.

== In London ==
Engaged by Richard Wroughton, on a report from John Bannister, for Drury Lane Theatre for three years, Knight arrived with wife and children in London, only to find the theatre burnt down. It was at the Lyceum, where the company moved, the Knight made his first appearance in London, 14 October 1809, as Timothy Quaint in the Soldier's Daughter (Andrew Cherry), and Robin Roughhead in Fortune's Frolic by John Till Allingham. He built on success with Label in The Prize (Prince Hoare), and his creation of Jerry Blossom in Isaac Pocock's Hit or Miss, 26 February 1810, in which he and Charles Mathews as Cypher saved the piece. With the company he went to the new theatre in Drury Lane, where he remained constant until his death. Simple in the Merry Wives of Windsor, 23 October 1812, is the first part in which he can be traced there. The Clown in Twelfth Night and Little John in Robin Hood were given during his first season. He played typically domestics, rustics, and farm-labourers. Among his original parts were Tom in The Intrigue and Farmer Enfield in The Falls of Clyde.

== Last years ==
During the season of 1825–6 Knight retired from the stage because of illness. He died 21 February 1826 at his house in Great Queen Street, Lincoln's Inn Fields, and was buried on the 27th in a vault in St. Pancras New Church.

== Family ==
At Stafford Knight married a Miss Clews, the daughter of a local wine merchant. At Leeds she died, and Knight, left with a young family, married in 1807 Susan Smith, who had succeeded her sister, Sarah Bartley, as leading lady in the company. John Prescott Knight was his son by his first wife.

== Notes ==
Attribution

This article incorporates text from a publication now in the public domain: Lee, Sidney, ed. (1892). "Knight, Edward". Dictionary of National Biography. Vol. 31. London: Smith, Elder & Co.
