= John Prescott Knight =

English portrait painter (1803–1881)

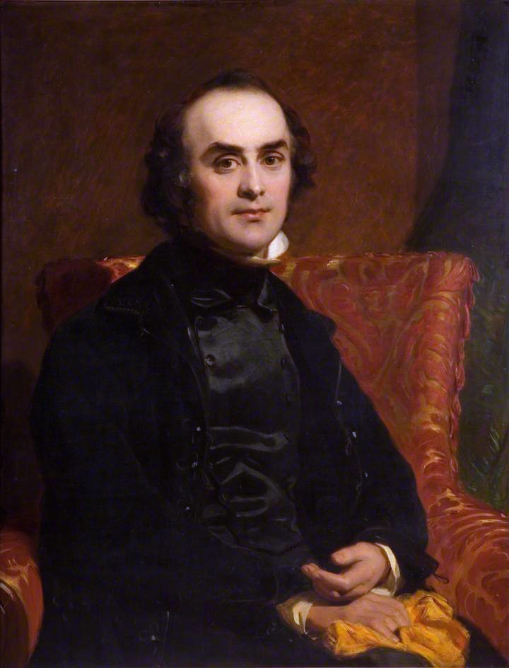
- Self-portrait, c.1844
- Known for: Portrait painting

John Prescott Knight RA (1803–1881) was an English portrait painter. He was secretary of the Royal Academy from 1848 until 1873.

== Biography ==
The son of the actor Edward Knight, he was born in Stafford in 1803. He began his working life in the office of a West India merchant in the City of London, who went out of business soon afterwards. He then studied drawing with Henry Sass and painting with George Clint before becoming a student at the Royal Academy in 1823.

In 1824 he showed portraits of his father and of Alfred Bunn the manager of Drury Lane Theatre at the Royal Academy. He continued to paint theatrical portraits for some years although what the Dictionary of National Biography calls "pictures of a more fanciful character" came to dominate his production. In 1828 his Whist Party and List, ye Landsmen were hung at the British Institution. In 1835 he appeared with Tam o' Shanter at the Royal Academy, of which he became an associate in 1836, and professor of perspective (1839–60).

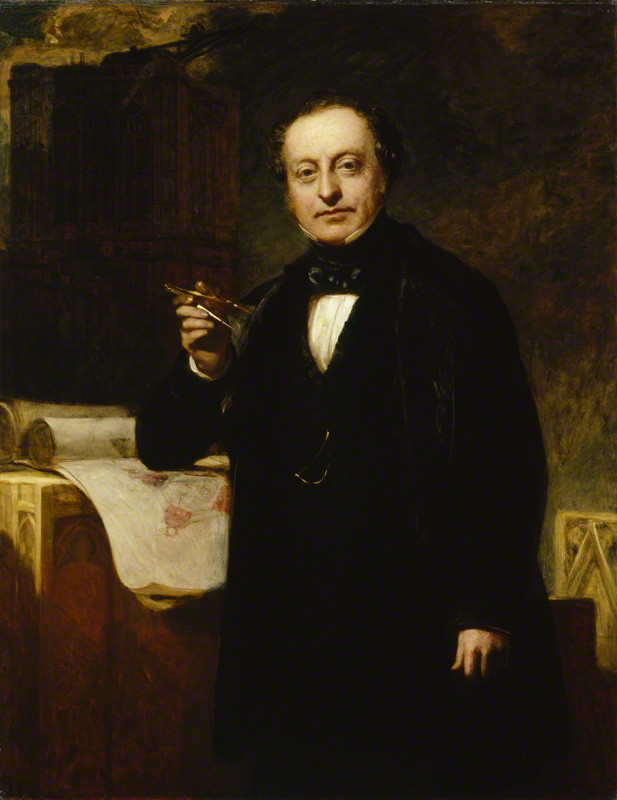
Portrait of Charles Barry, 1851

From around 1840 he concentrated on portraiture again, depicting both individuals, such as the Duke of Wellington for the London City Club, the Duke of Cambridge for Christ's Hospital, and Sir George Burrows for Saint Bartholomew's Hospital, and large groups, as in his Waterloo Banquet (1842) and Peninsular Heroes (1848). He became a full member of the Royal Academy in 1844 and served as its secretary from 1848 until 1873. He exhibited there for the last time in 1878, showing A Sandy Hillside.

He was an enthusiastic member of Edward Irving's Catholic Apostolic church. His wife, who died before him, exhibited a few pictures of domestic subjects at the British Institution and elsewhere between 1832 and 1837.

Knight died at 24 Maida Hill West, London, on 26 March 1881, and was buried in Kensal Green Cemetery.
