= Queen's Park, Brighton =

Public park in Brighton, England

Coordinates: 50°49′29″N 00°07′32″W

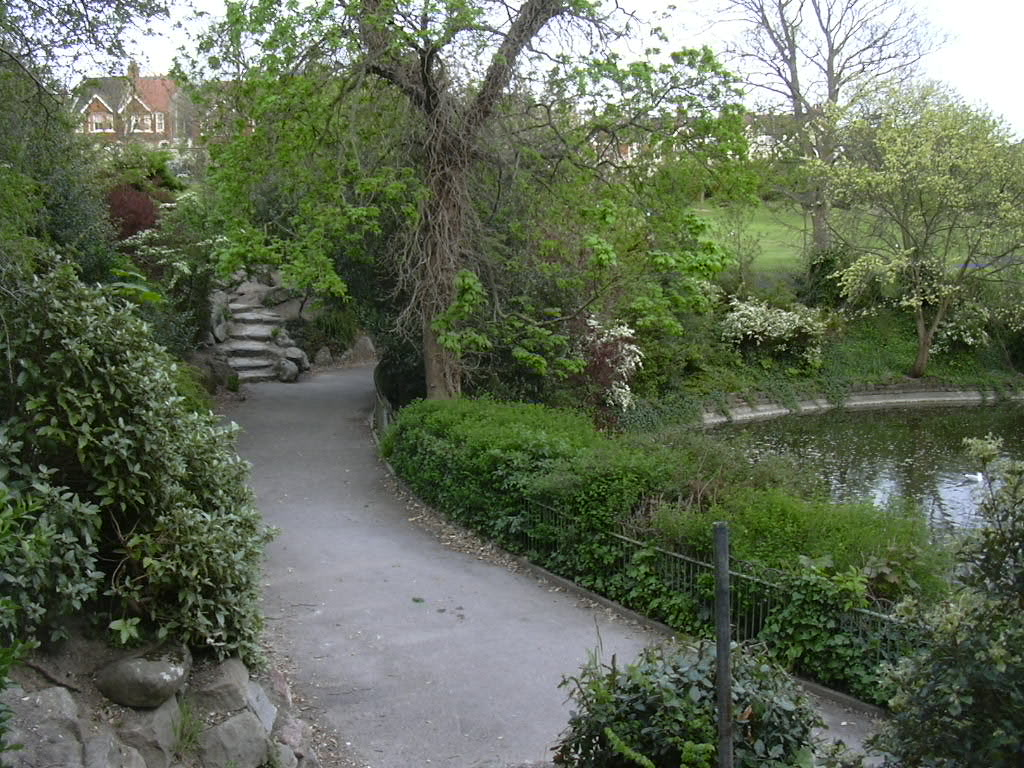
Path round the pond in the park

Queen's Park is a public park and area of Brighton, England.

In 1825, Thomas Attree, a property owner and developer in Brighton, acquired land north of Eastern Road—already known as Brighton Park—to build a residential park surrounded by detached villas, inspired by Regent's Park in London. He commissioned architect Charles Galloway to design it. Attree renamed it after Queen Adelaide. She patronised the German Spa opened in 1825 by Dr F A A Struve of Dresden at the south end of the park, which remained in operation until 1886 when it continued as a mineral water plant until 1960. On the site now stands the Royal Spa Nursery school. Attree's plan never fully materialised and the surrounding housing is mostly late Victorian with some late 20th century infill and replacement.

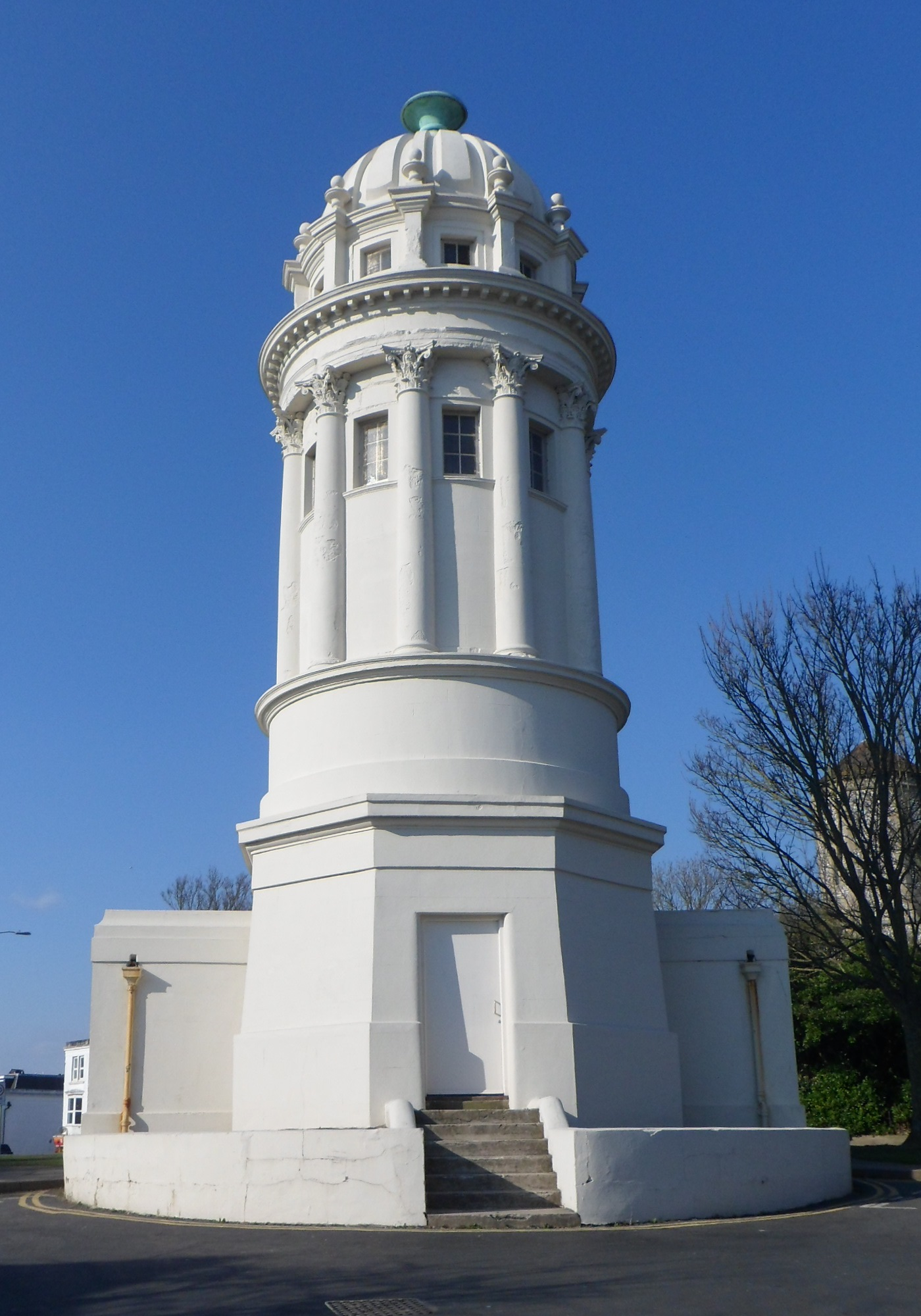
The Pepper Pot

At the north-west corner is Pennant Lodge, once the home of Charles Freshfield. Also to the north-west of the park itself, on Queen's Park Road, stands the Pepper Pot (also called the "Pepper Box"). Probably originally built as a horizontal wind-powered water pump, and later used for the publishing of a local newspaper, it was later an artist's studio and by the 1990s a public convenience. In the 21st century it has been sealed and unused. The park itself, without the houses but including the Spa and the Pepper pot, was bought by the Race Stand Trustees in 1890 for £13,500 and donated to the town.

Today Queen's Park has a large pond, frequented by ducks, geese and herring gulls. A popular myth is that the pond was created when a First World War plane crashed in the middle of the park creating a crater lower than the water table. Although untrue, this myth is probably based on a real-life event when a recreational biplane, piloted by retired Air Marshall Phillip Austin, crash landed in the pond in 1923. Austin and the pond emerged unscathed.

The park is also home to a children's play area, a café, an extensive dog-free area, a scented garden for people with disabilities, a former bowling green, tennis courts, and an area that is left untended in order to encourage wildlife. Kemp Town Bowling Club stopped using the bowling green in 2007, it had previously provided a filming location for the 1987 film "Wish You Were Here" starring Emily Lloyd
