= Philbrook Museum of Art =

Art museum in Tulsa, Oklahoma

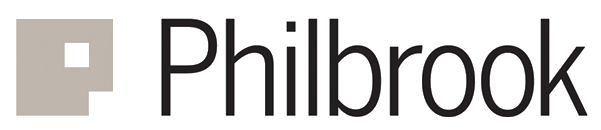

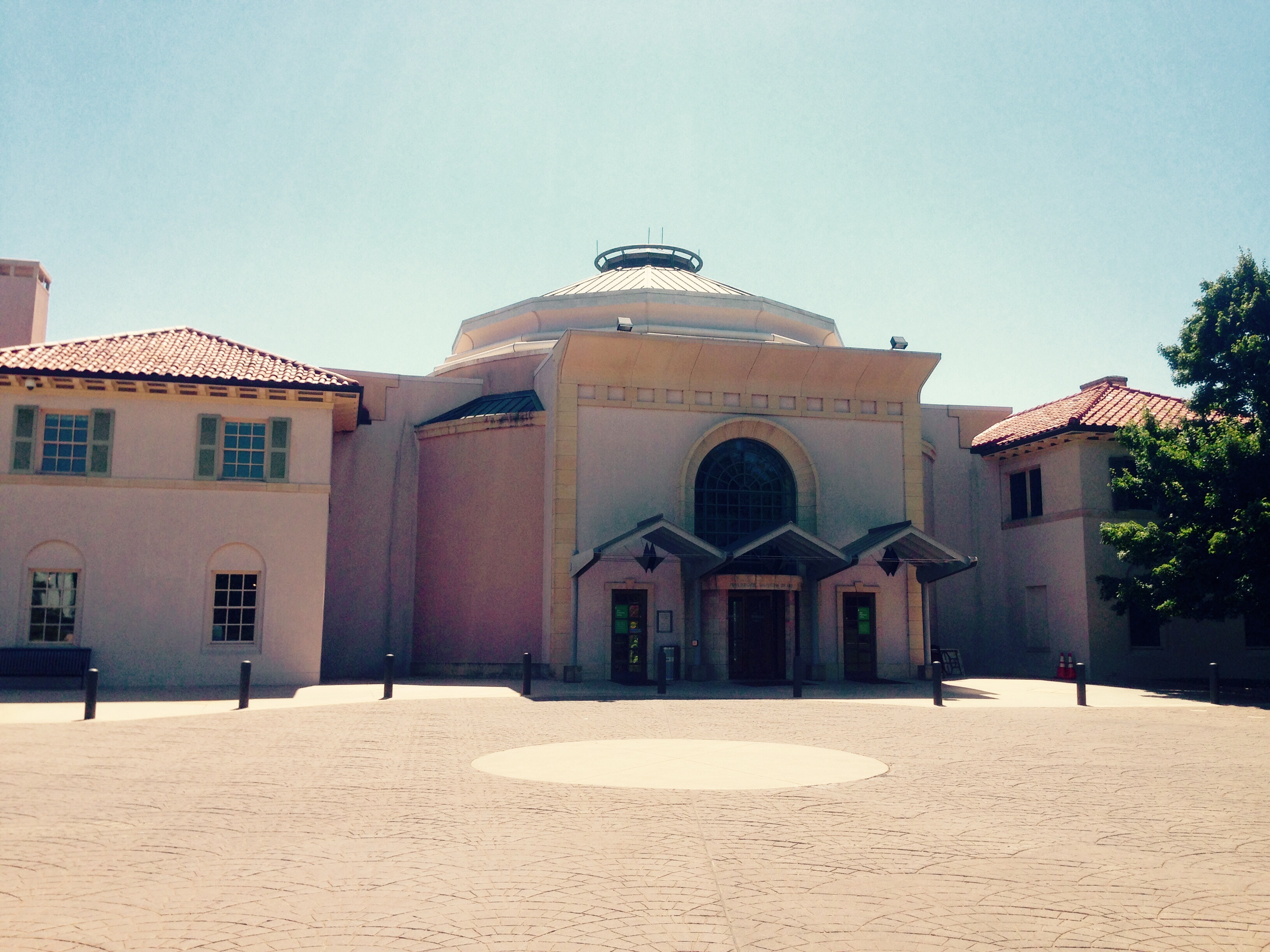
- Philbrook Museum of Art
- Interactive fullscreen map
- Established: 1939
- Location: 2727 S Rockford Rd, Tulsa, Oklahoma (United States)
- Coordinates: 36°07′26″N 95°58′12″W
- Visitors: 160,000
- Director: Megan Nesbit
- Website: philbrook.org

Philbrook Museum of Art is an art museum with expansive formal gardens located in Tulsa, Oklahoma. The museum, which opened in 1939, is located in a former 1920s villa, "Villa Philbrook", the home of Oklahoma oil pioneer Waite Phillips and his wife Genevieve. Showcasing nine collections of art from all over the world, and spanning various artistic media and styles, the cornerstone collection focuses on Native American art featuring basketry, pottery, paintings and jewelry.

== History ==
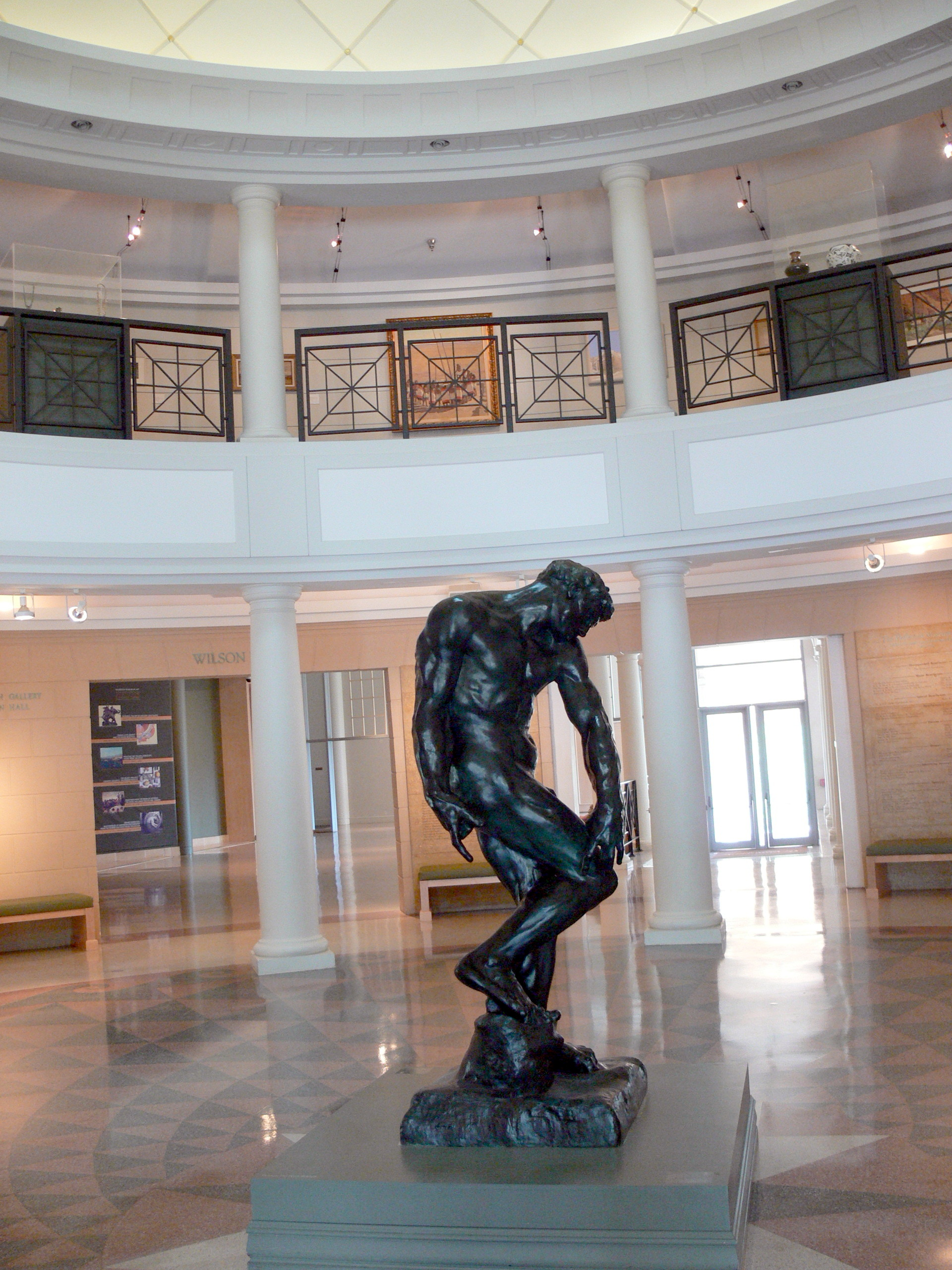
Philbrook Museum of Art Rotunda

The Philbrook Art Museum, under the guidance of its first director, Eugene Kingman, opened its doors to the public on October 25, 1939 with a permanent art collection made up of works from the Tulsa Art Association and Villa Philbrook. In 1940, studio art classes were initiated and a touring program for school children the following year that resulted in the addition of a Children's Museum in 1949. A new museum wing was built in 1969 in response to an increased demand for studio art classes, but the use of this space has since changed. The art museum underwent difficult financial times in the 1980s and a renaissance in the 1990s. The name changed from the Philbrook Art Center to The Philbrook Museum of Art in 1987 when it was first accredited. In 2009, after a two-year process, Philbrook was reaccredited by the American Alliance of Museums (AAM), one of 286 art museums and 775 museums overall out of the estimated 17,500 museums in the United States.

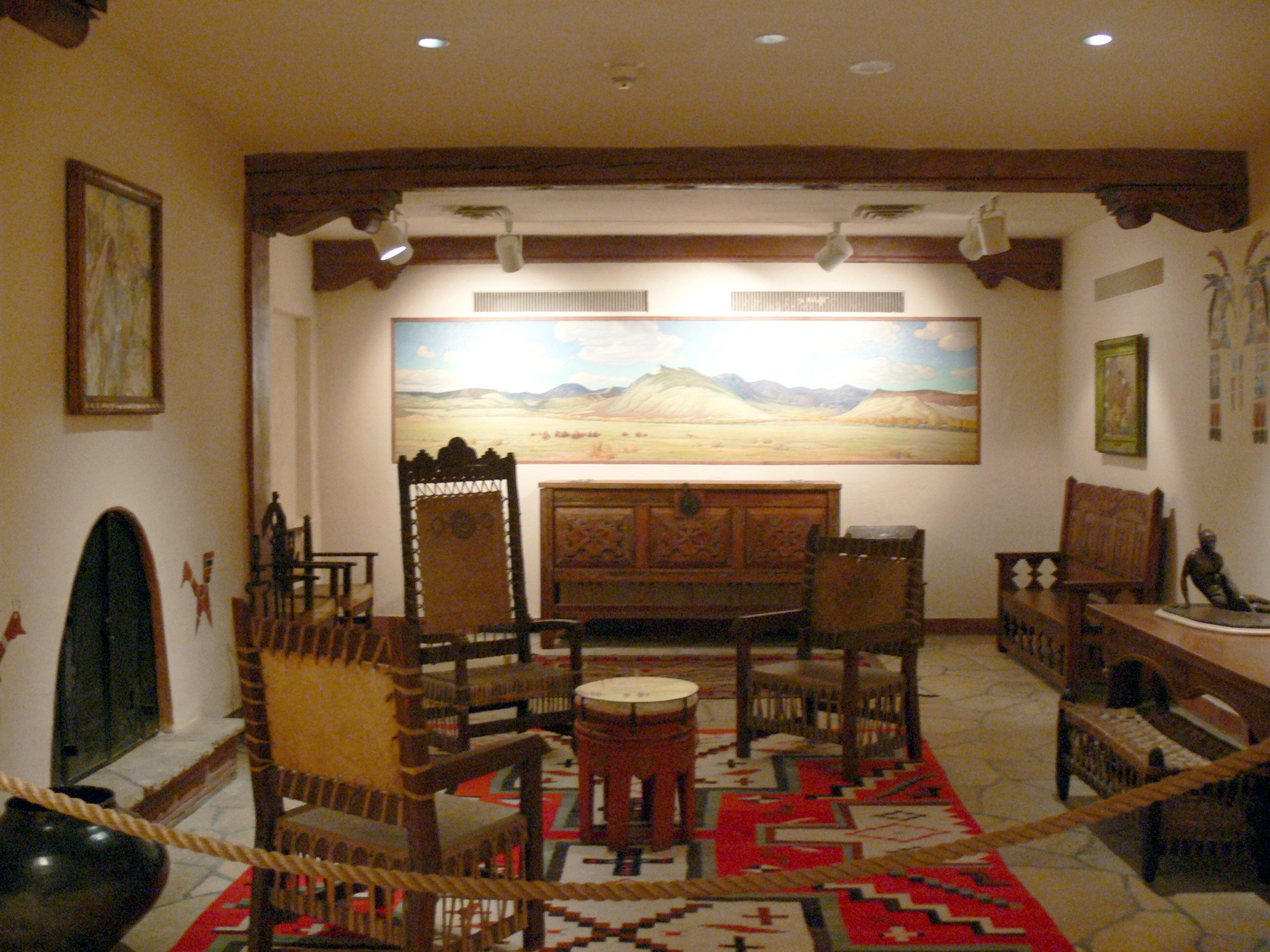
Santa Fe Room

In 1990, the museum was expanded by the addition of the 70,000 square feet (6,500 m^{2}) Kravis Wing that included space for a special exhibition gallery, public entry rotunda, museum school, library, a restaurant area that seats up to 100 people, an expanded museum shop and event space. The Williams Conference Center seats 75 to 80 people and the Patti Johnson Wilson Hall, an auditorium performance hall, seats up to 236 people. On June 14, 2013, Philbrook opened Philbrook Downtown, a satellite facility in Tulsa's Brady Arts District. With 30,000 square feet (2,800 m^{2}) dedicated to modern, contemporary, and Native American art, works on view included pieces by notable 20th-century artists, including Willem de Kooning, Robert Rauschenberg, Clyfford Still, and Georgia O'Keeffe. The upper level of the facility featured the Eugene B. Adkins Collection and the Adkins Study Center. In 2020, the satellite location closed to make way for the Bob Dylan Center.

The museum's permanent collection encompasses European, American, Native American, Modern and Contemporary Art and Design, African, Asian and Antiquities. The collection has grown steadily with gifts of American Indian pottery and basketry from Clark Field beginning in 1942 and the Roberta Campbell Lawson collection in 1947. While the American and European collection received a boost from Laura Rutherford Clubb who donated paintings in 1947, and further donations from the Samuel H. Kress Foundation in 1961 of Italian Renaissance paintings and sculptures. The Asian, African, and antiquities collections were enhanced by generous gifts from George H. Taber, Pete and Velma Gillert and Lawrence and Herbert Gussman in the succeeding three decades. Today the collection includes works from Giovanni Bellini, William-Adolphe Bouguereau, William Merritt Chase, Leonardo Drew, Arturo Herrera, Charles Loloma, Maria Martinez, Thomas Moran, Pablo Picasso, Fritz Scholder, Tanzio da Varallo, Rachel Whiteread, Kehinde Wiley, and Andrew Wyeth. The Eugene B. Adkins Collection of Native American painting, pottery and jewelry is shared with the Fred Jones Jr. Museum of Art.

== Building ==
=== Villa Philbrook ===
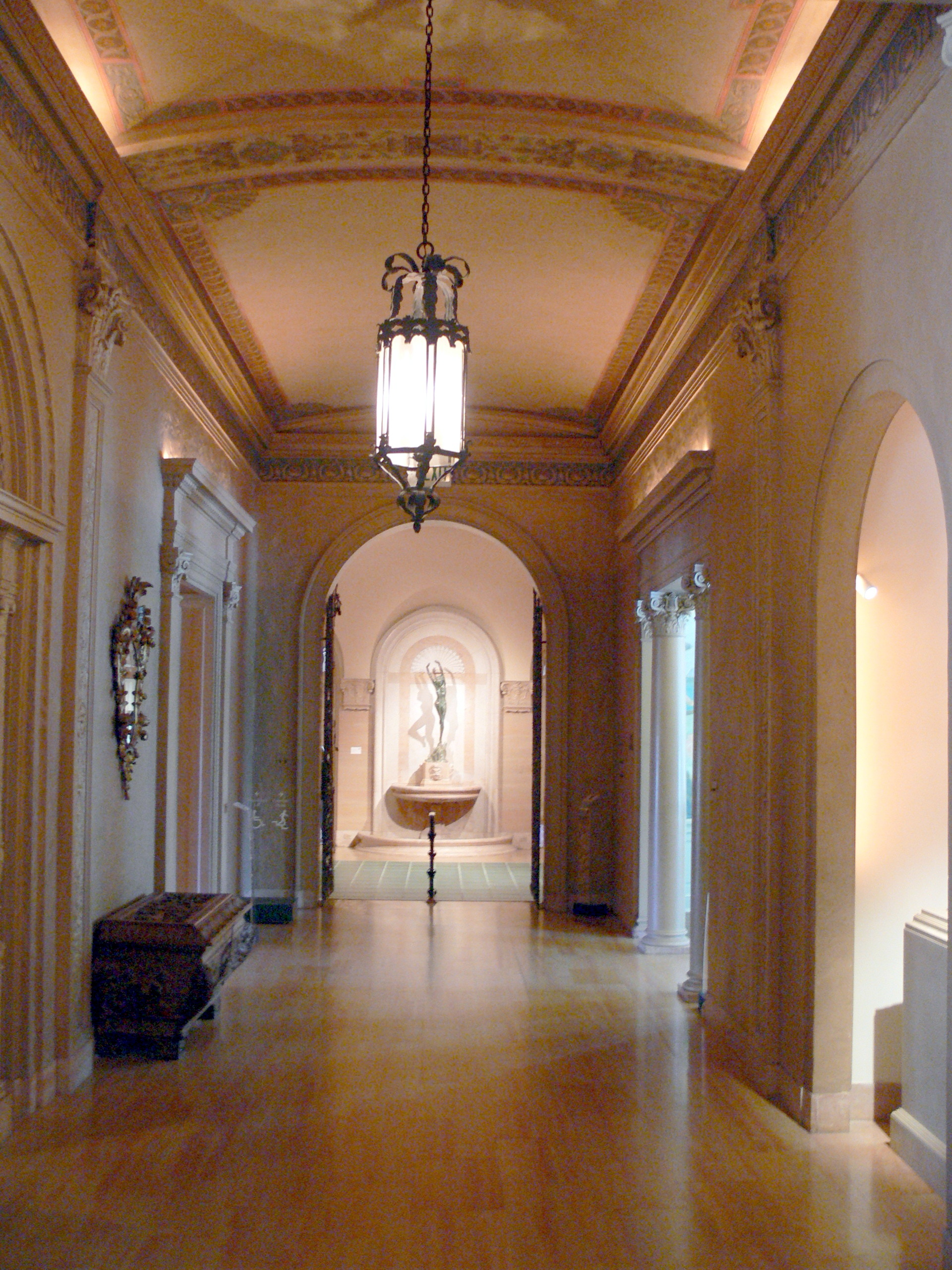
Philbrook Museum of Art Gallery

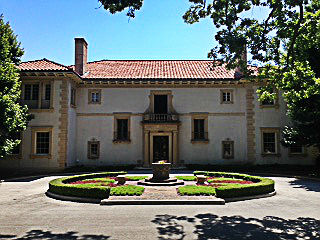
Villa Philbrook main facade

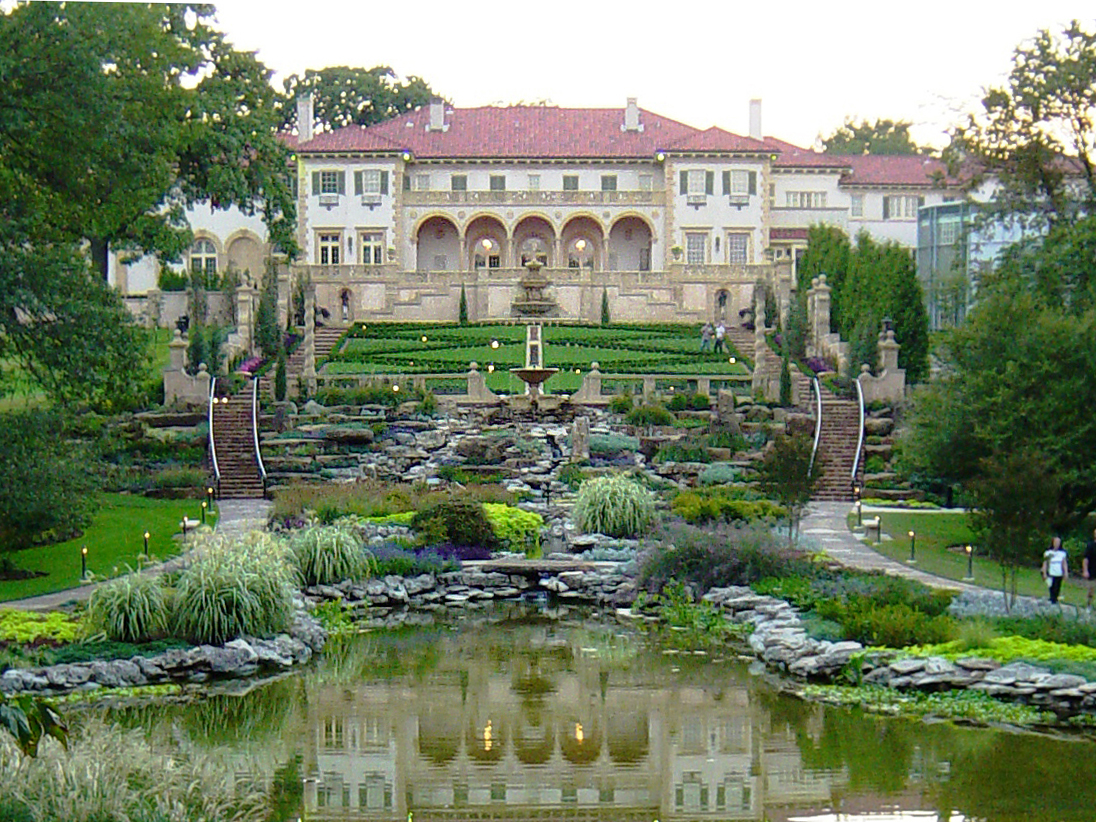
Garden view of the villa

The original structure of the museum is an Italian Renaissance villa that was the former home of Oklahoma oil pioneer Waite Phillips and his wife Genevieve. Phillips commissioned prominent Kansas City architect Edward Buehler Delk to design the mansion in 1926; construction began the same year by the John Long Company of Kansas City and was completed the following year. Named "Villa Philbrook," the three-story mansion was constructed of steel and a reinforced concrete framework that resulted in minimal remodeling being required to transform the villa into an art museum. The exterior of the house is stucco that includes ground white marble in the mixture causing it to glitter. The corners are quoined with Kasota limestone, quarried in Minnesota, that resemble Italian travertine. This stonework also decorates the doors and windows. In the rear of the house, a loggia showcasing five arches with Corinthian columns, highlights a terrace overlooking the formal gardens. The roof features wide eaves and is covered with oversized Italianate tiles.

The interior of the mansion featured 72 rooms decorated with travertine and marble fireplaces and fountains, floors of teak, walnut and oak and ornate ceilings reminiscent of Italian villas. The main rooms of the house were found on the ground floor. The mansion is centered by the entrance hall, framed by a double staircase, that flows directly into the receiving hall. The hall is separated by a slightly raised cross-corridor with a groin vaulted ceiling painted with Italian Renaissance designs, further defined by twisted Corinthian columns and ironwork. The main features of the receiving hall are the beams and pierced screenwork that appear to be wood, but are actually painted plaster. Also, a two-manual Aeolian pipe organ can be found behind a large tapestry. Flanking the entrance and receiving halls and accessed by the cross-corridor are the dining room and library to the left and the living and music rooms to the right. The dining and living rooms feature heavily carved coffered ceilings, and the wood paneled library is centered by a globe light fixture that reproduces a map from the time of Leonardo da Vinci. The airy music room is highlighted by a wall mural with bobbed-hair flappers in Grecian garb that illustrates four musical tempos: scherzo, andante, rondo and allegro.

In the wing to the right of the main block of the house was a sunroom and to the left was the service wing that included the kitchen and servants quarters. On the second floor was the Phillip's private quarters containing four family bedrooms, each with a bathroom, dressing room and sleeping porch, and two guest rooms. A staircase located between the receiving hall and dining room accessed the lower floor leading to the Southwestern rooms and to the porte-cochère. In 1938, the Phillips donated Villa Philbrook and its surrounding gardens to the city of Tulsa, in hopes that the estate would be used for art and cultural purposes. While the principal rooms on the first floor were left virtually untouched, the rest of the space has been remodeled for its use as a public institution.

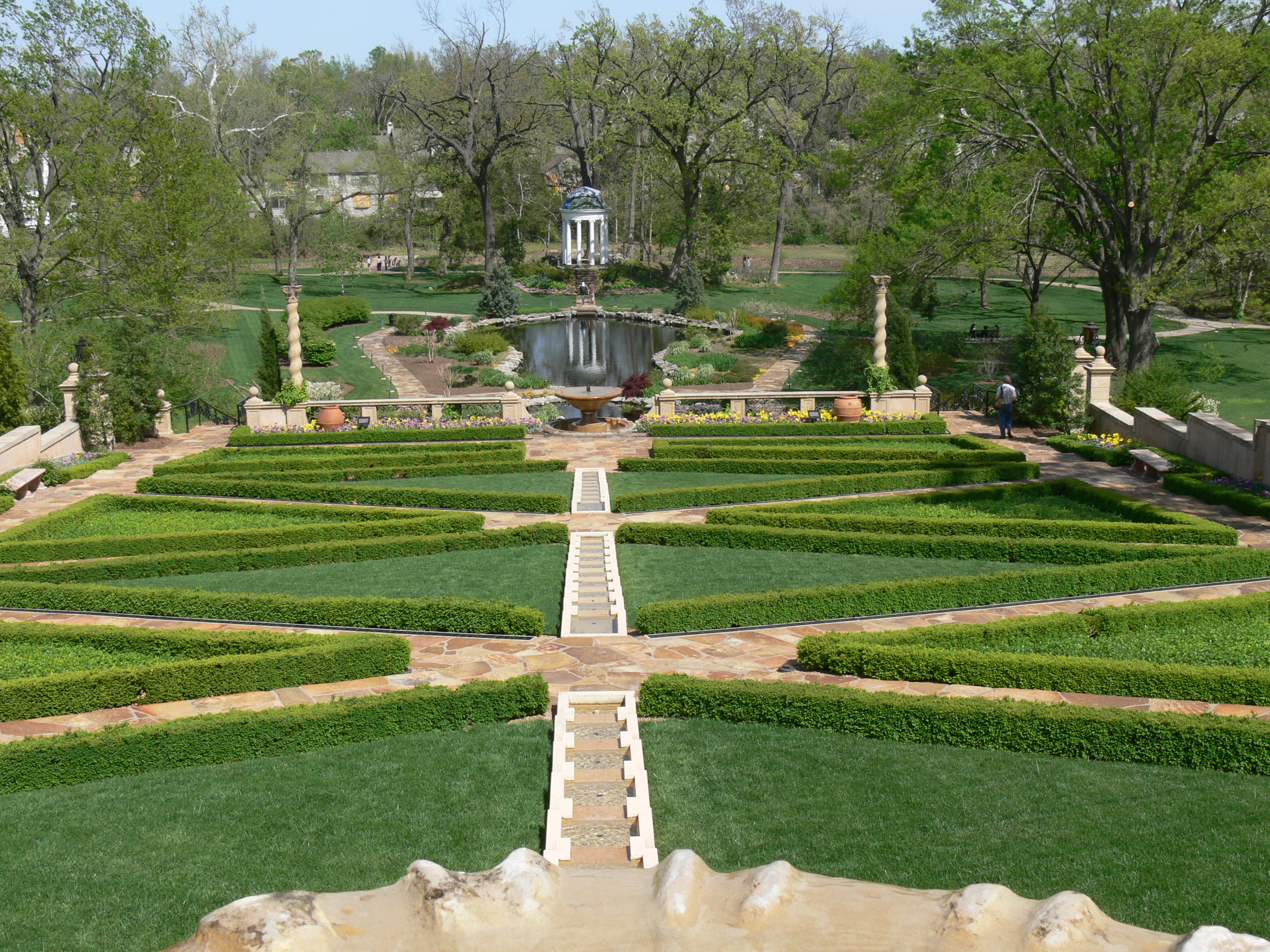
Formal gardens

== Gardens ==
The museum is situated on 25 acres (93,000 m^{2}) of formal and informal gardens. Originally designed by Hare & Hare, the expansive grounds contain elaborate gardens inspired by Villa Lante, an Italian country estate north of Rome designed by Giacomo Barozzi da Vignola in 1566. The formal gardens, with its rills and diagonal walks linking the mansion to the rustic pool below, graced with a classical tempietto, are part of the original design and construction. To the south of the property the gardens extending to the summerhouse were conceived later and completed in 2004. They feature native Oklahoma plants and a refurbished creek. The bronze sculpture by Barry Flanagan, Thinker on a Rock, is located in this section.

== Management ==
As of 2007, the museum has a staff of 60 and an operating budget of nearly $6 million. During the tenure of director Randall Suffolk between 2007 and 2015, the museum reorganized its curatorial and educational departments to emphasize more family-friendly programming, leading to a 63 percent increase in attendance. Suffolk also sharply increased the museum’s operating budget and added 2,800 new works to its permanent collection. Suffolk left in 2015 to lead the High Museum of Art in Atlanta. In 2016, Scott Stulen left his role as a curator at the Indianapolis Museum of Art to become the new Philbrook Executive Director.

== Collection ==
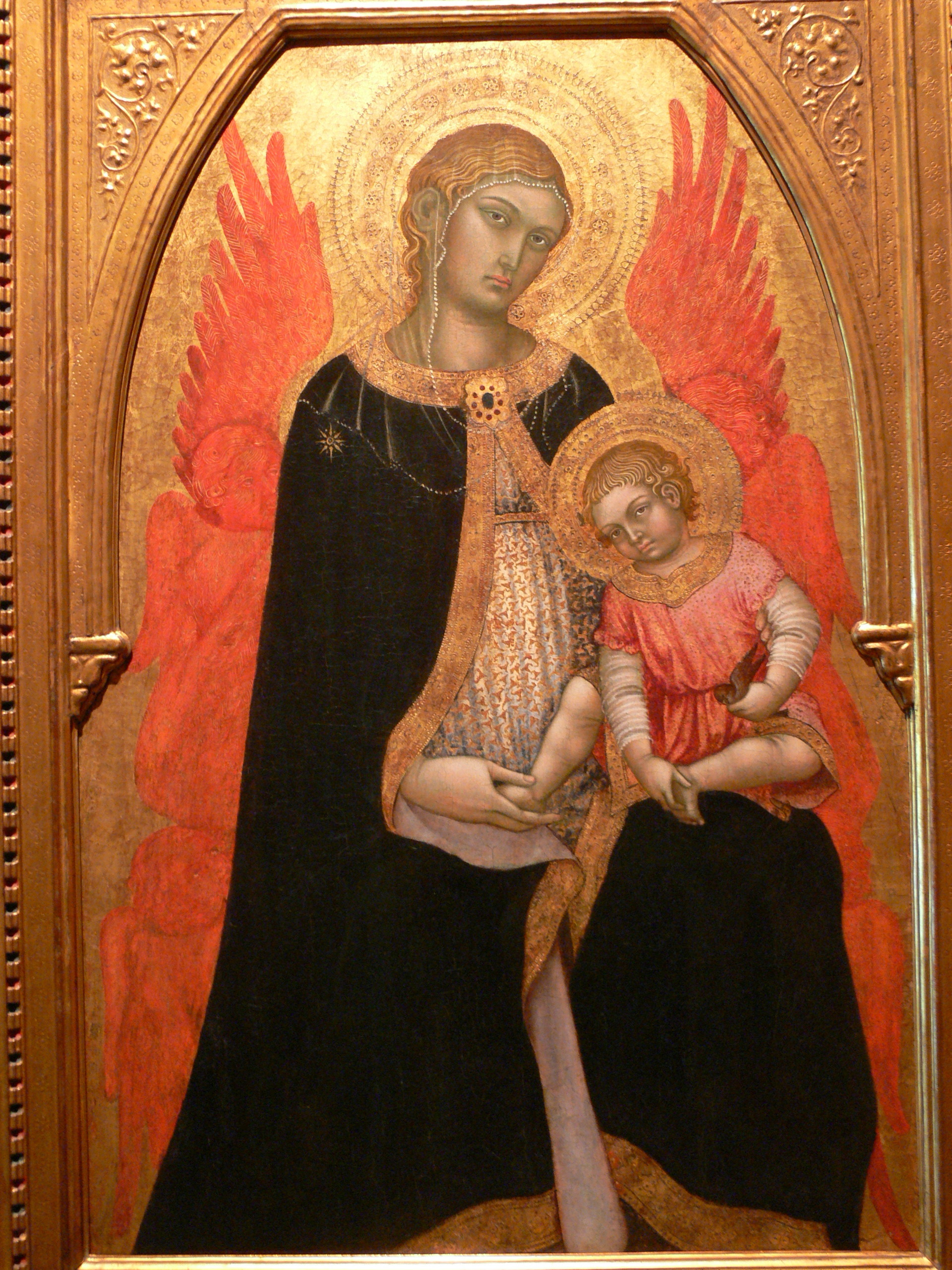
Taddeo di Bartolo, Madonna and Child (c. 1410)

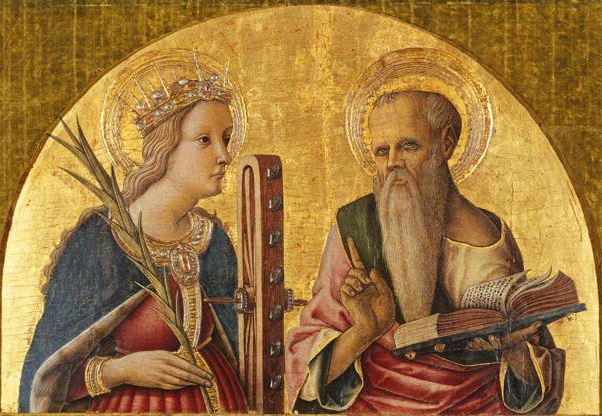
Carlo Crivelli, Saint Catherine of Alexandria and Girolamo (1470)

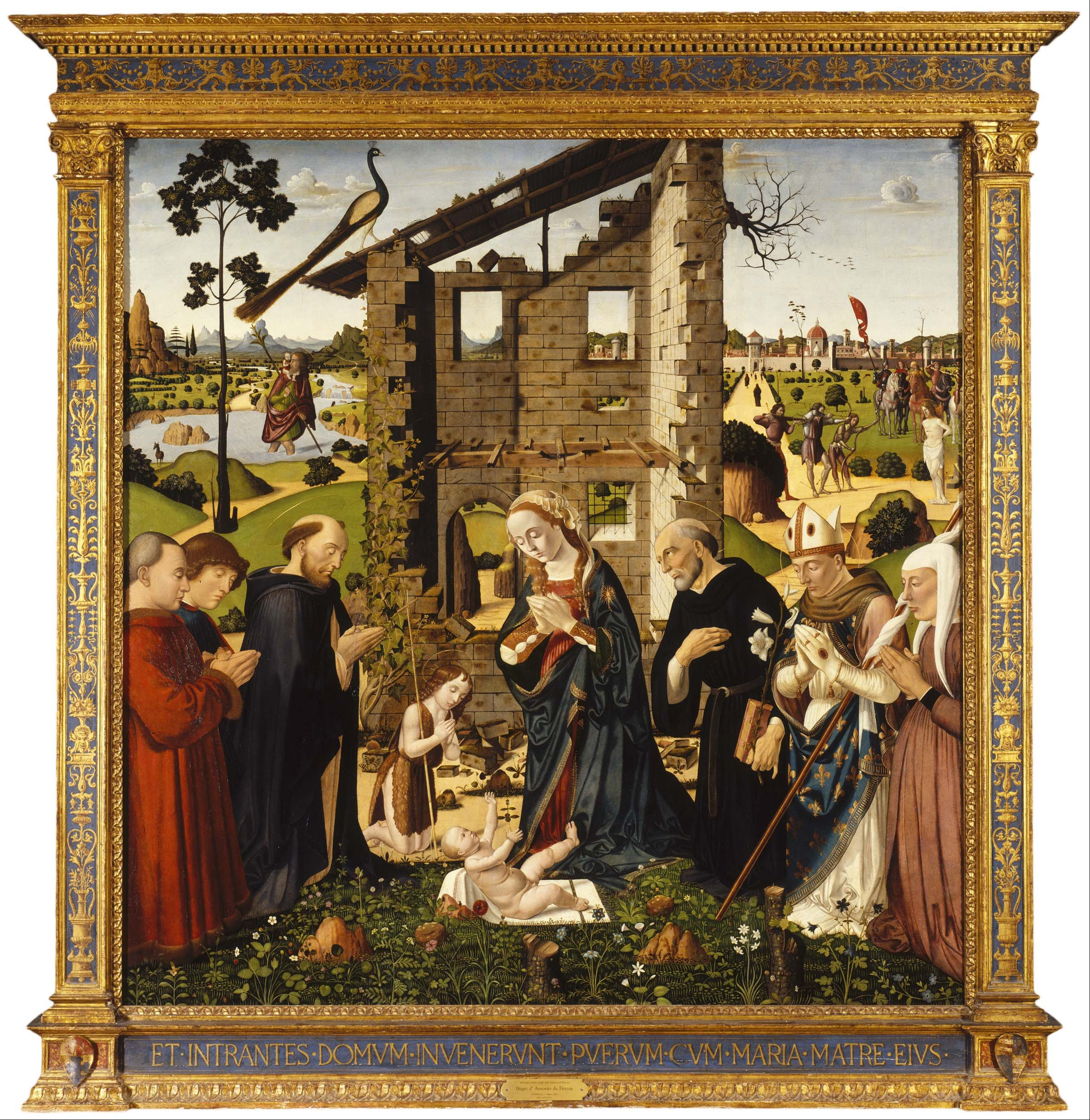
Biagio d'Antonio, The Adoration of the Child with Saints and Donors (c. 1476)

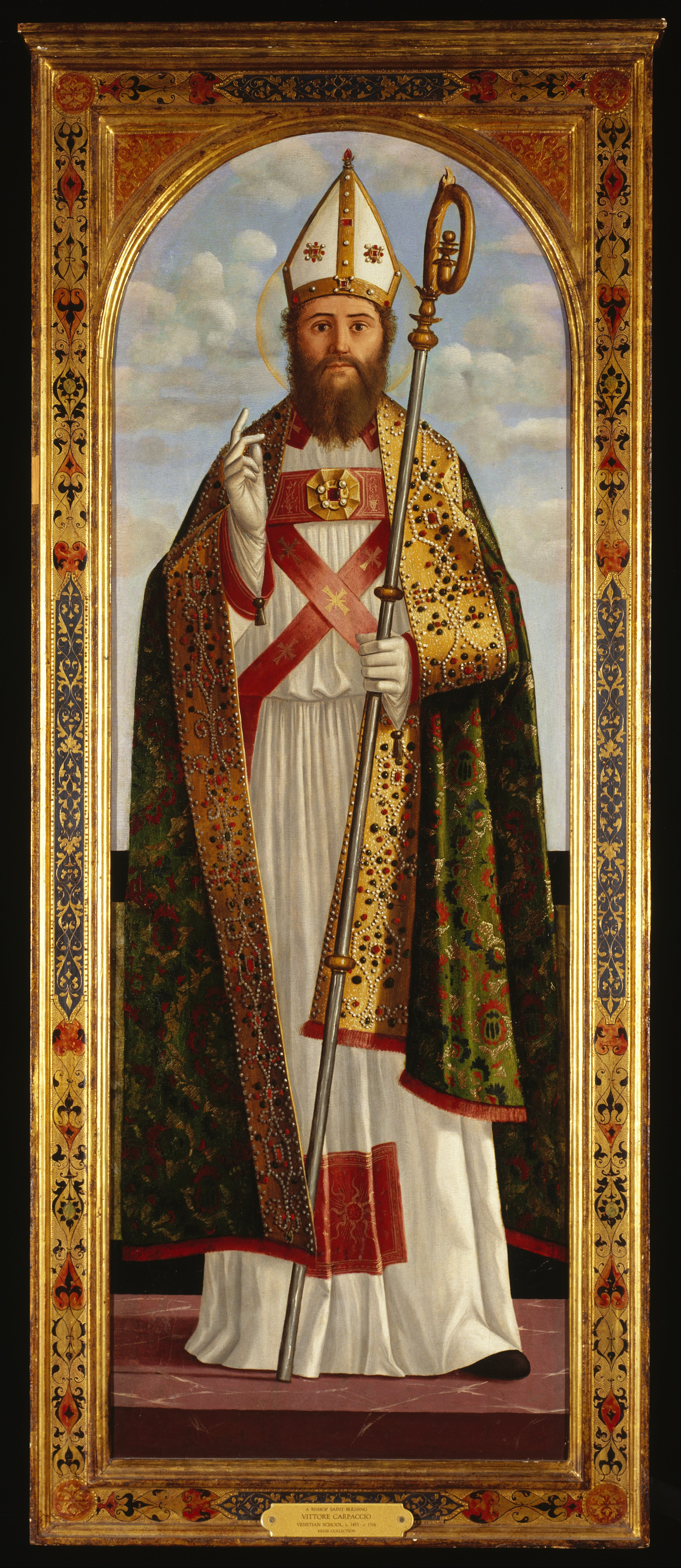
Vittore Carpaccio, A Bishop Saint Blessing (1514)

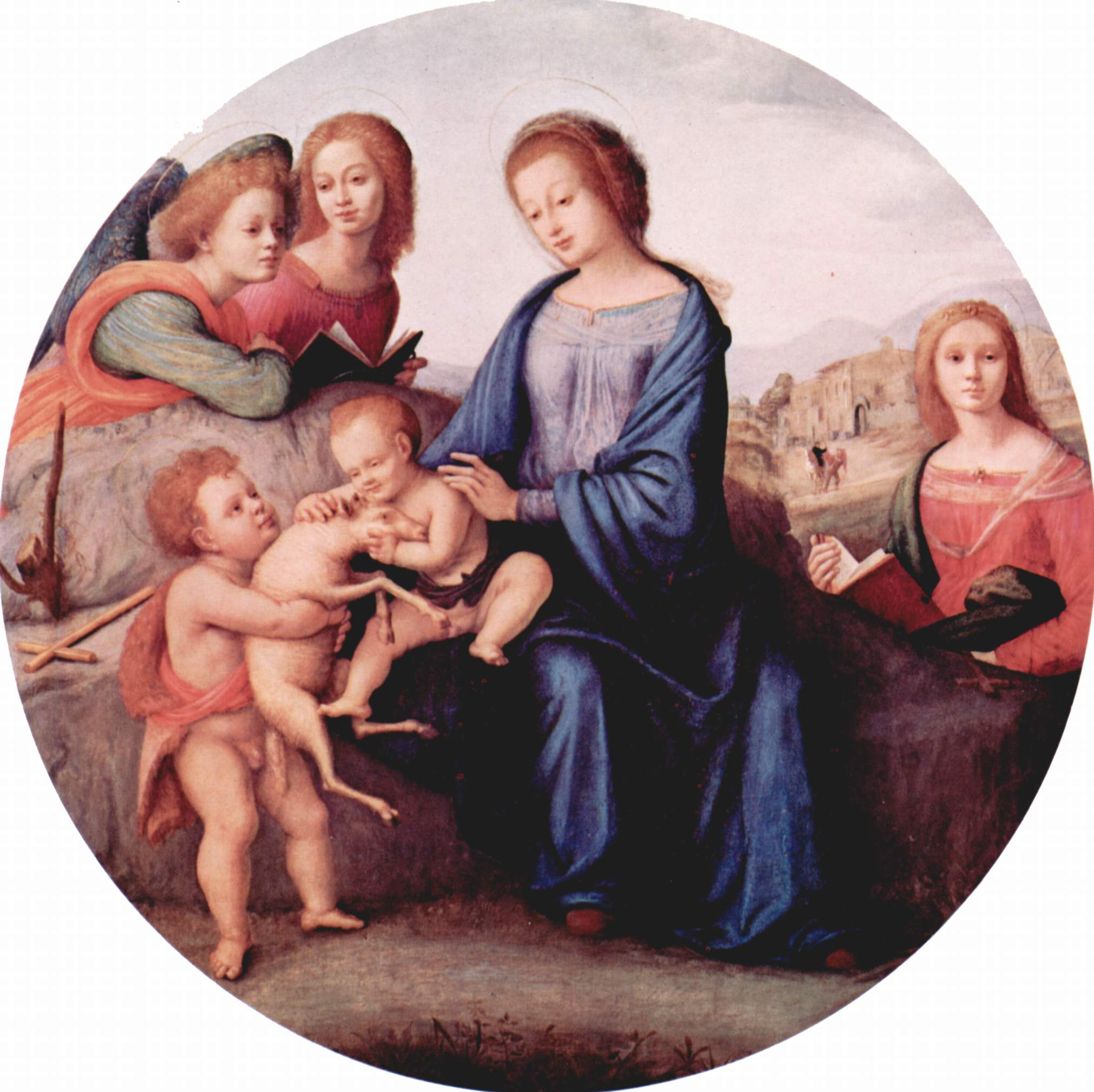
Piero di Cosimo, Madonna and Child with Saints and Angels (c. 1520)

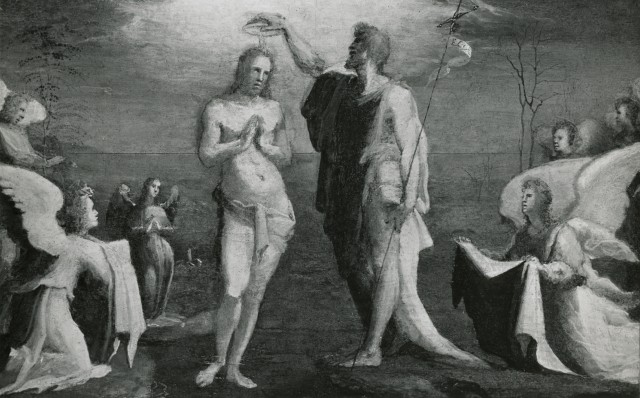
Domenico di Pace Beccafumi, The Baptism of Christ (1528)

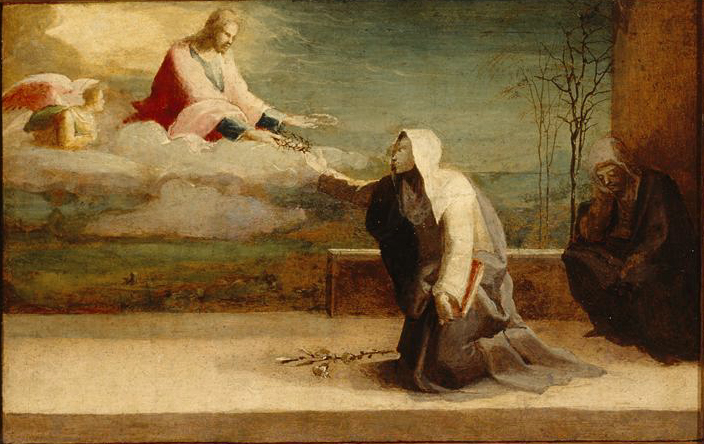
Domenico di Pace Beccafumi, Vision of Saint Catherine of Sienna (1528)

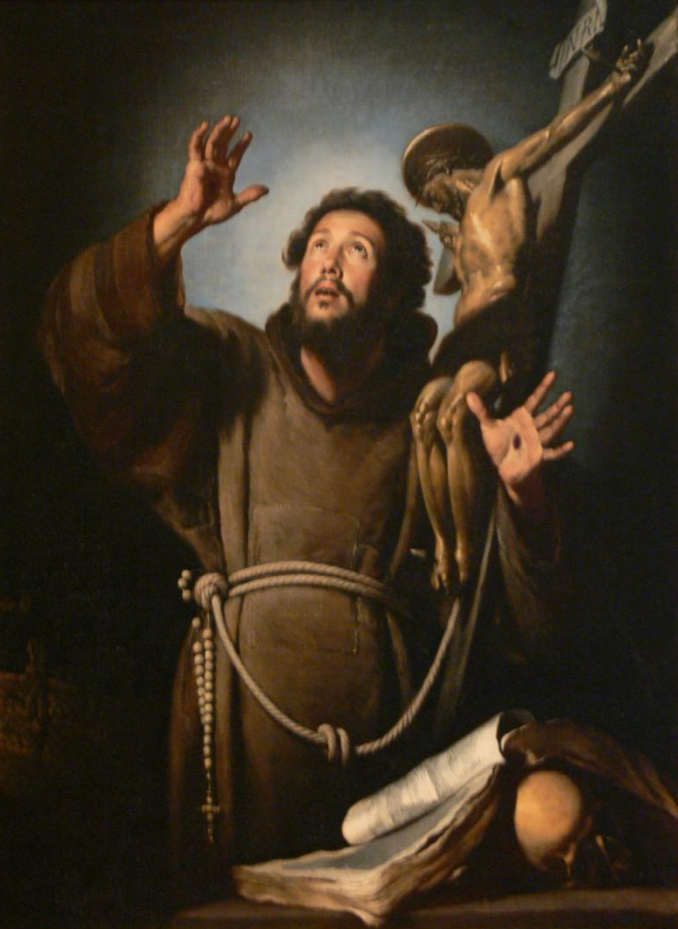
Bernardo Strozzi, St. Francis in Ecstasy (c. 1618-1620)

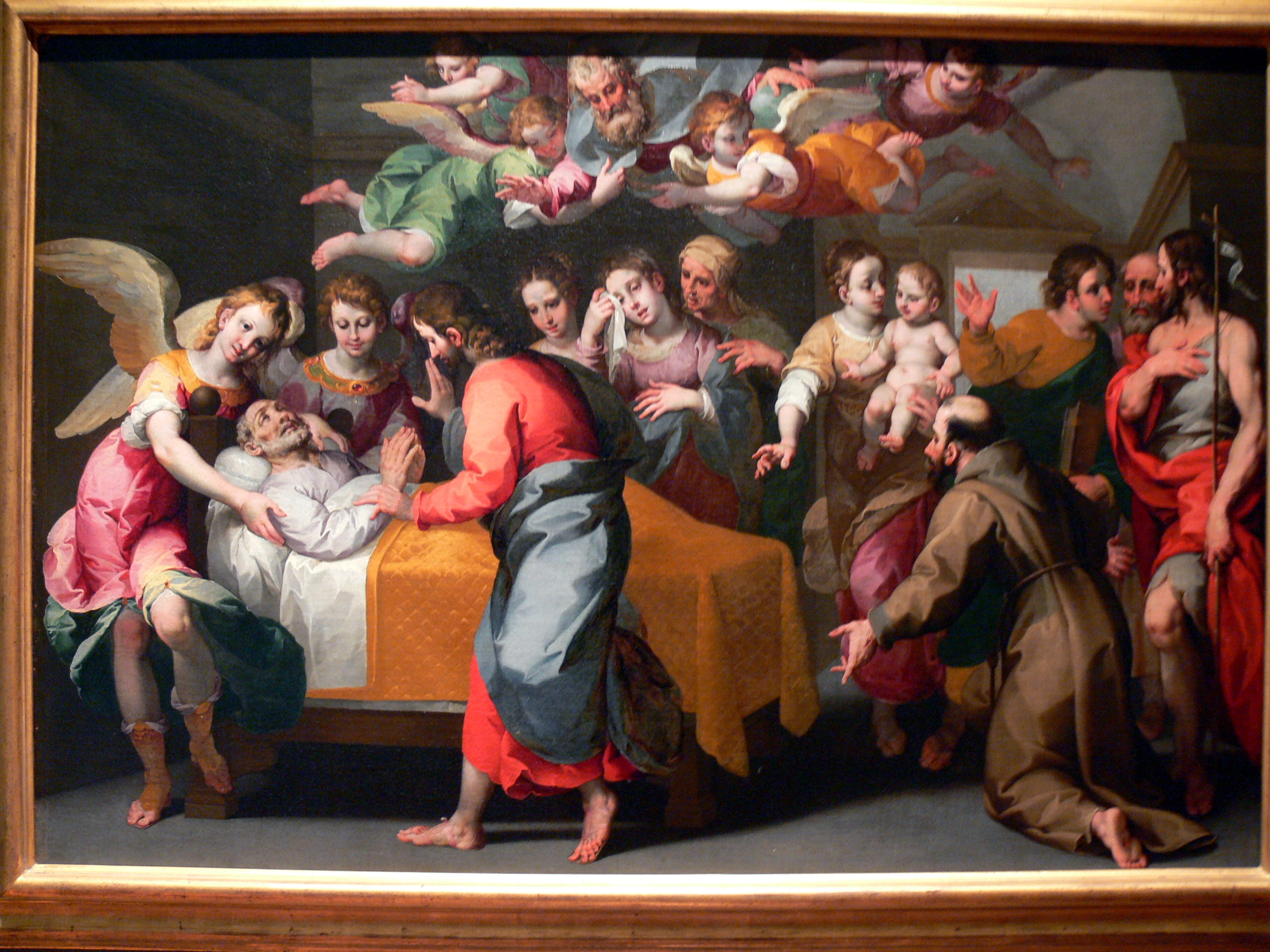
Simone Barabino, The Death of Saint Joseph (1620)

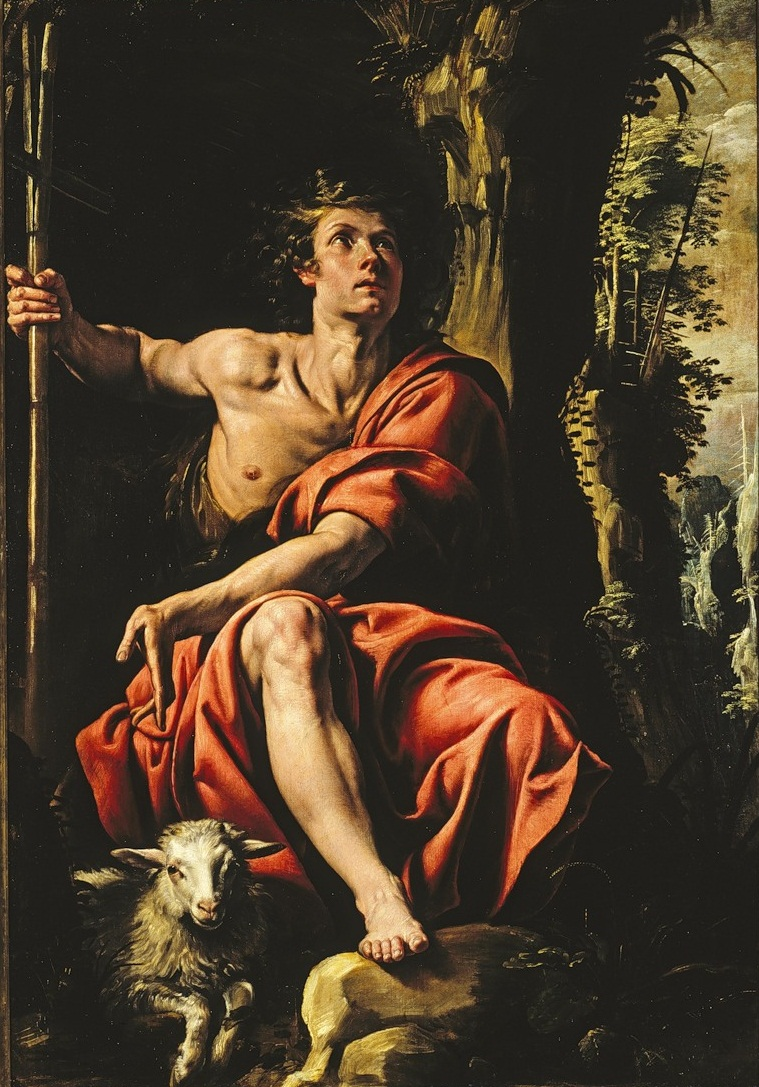
Tanzio da Varallo, Saint John the Baptist in the Wilderness (c. 1627-1629)

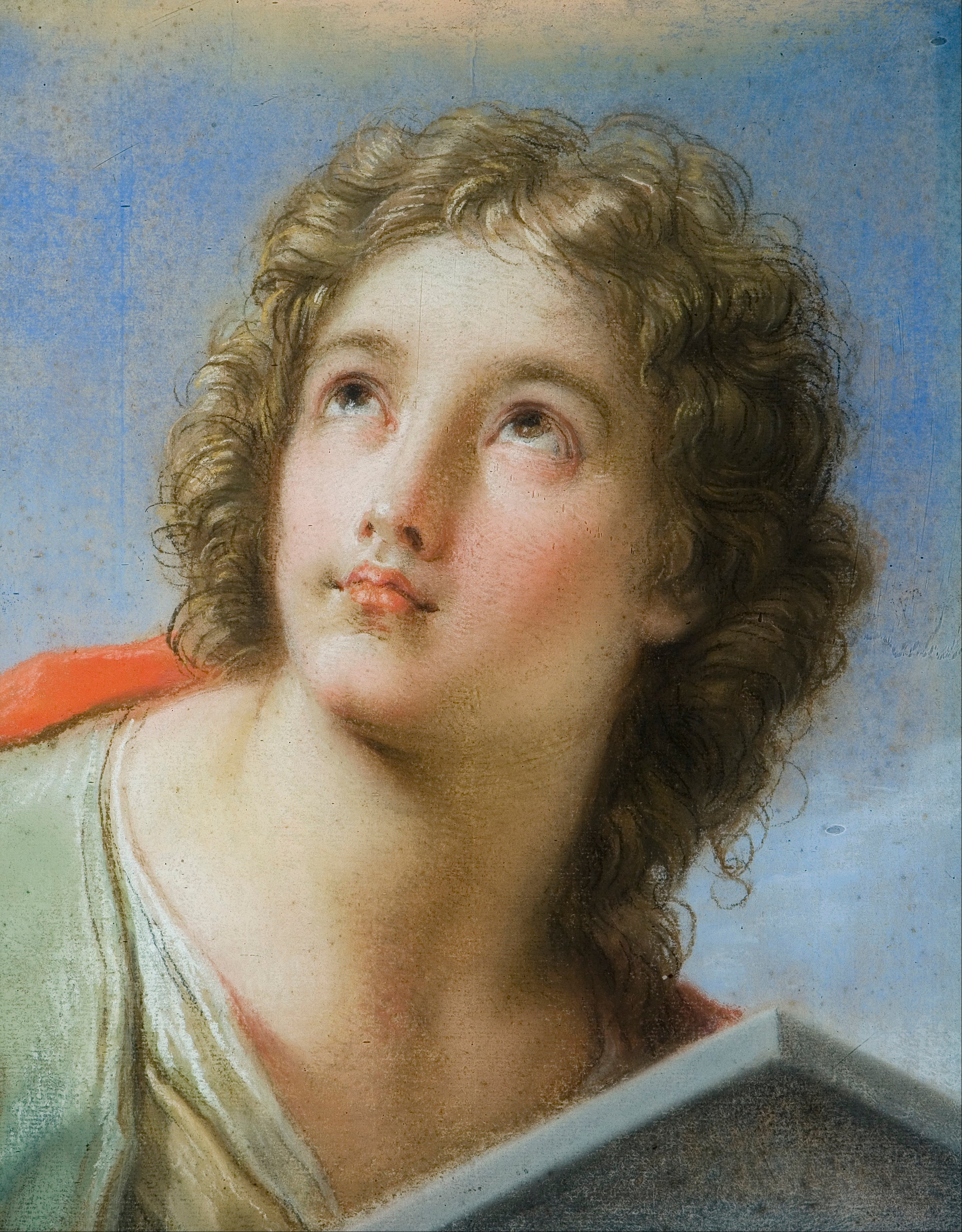
Benedetto Luti, Saint John the Evangelist (1712)

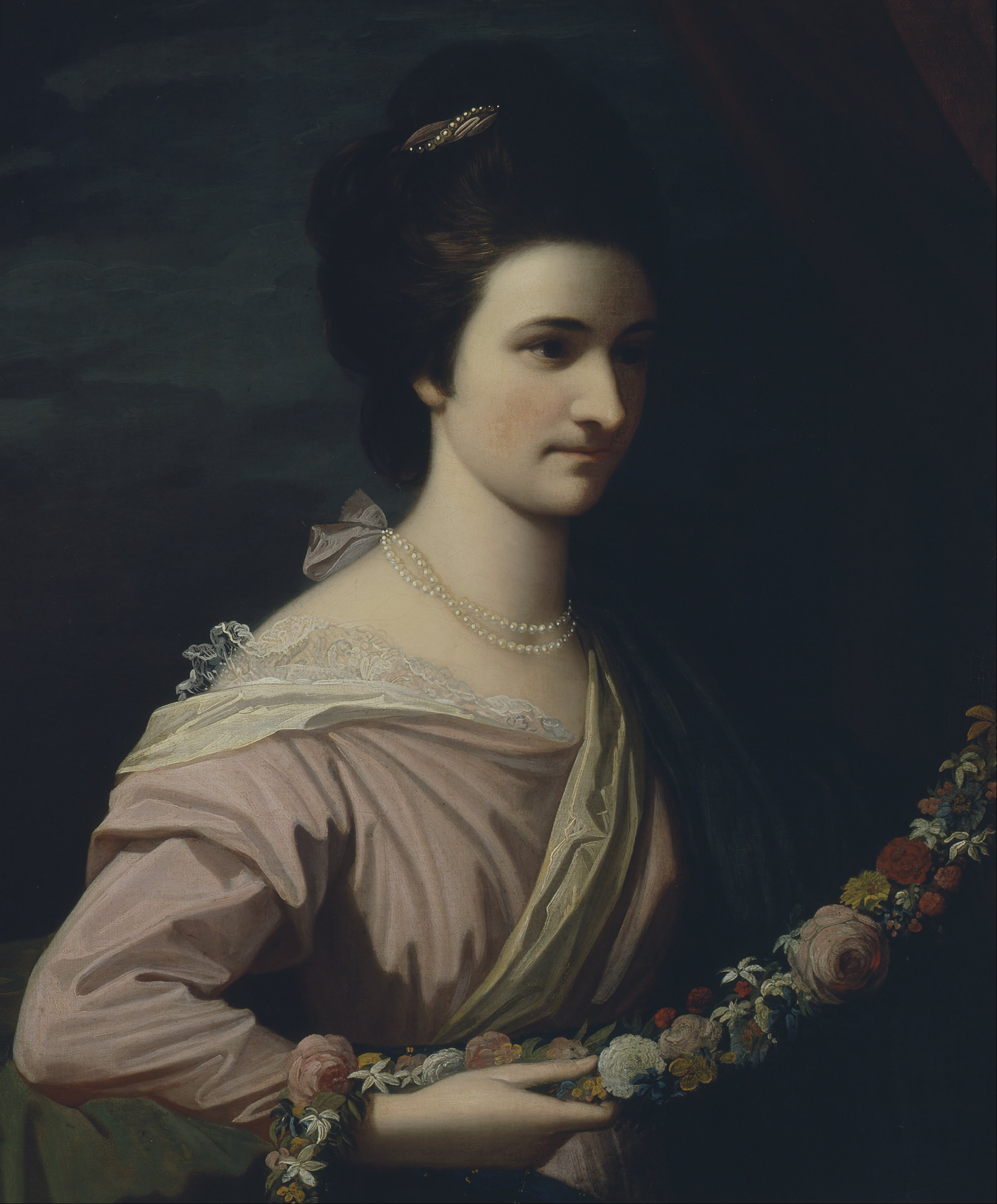
Benjamin West, Miss Elizabeth Milward (1770)

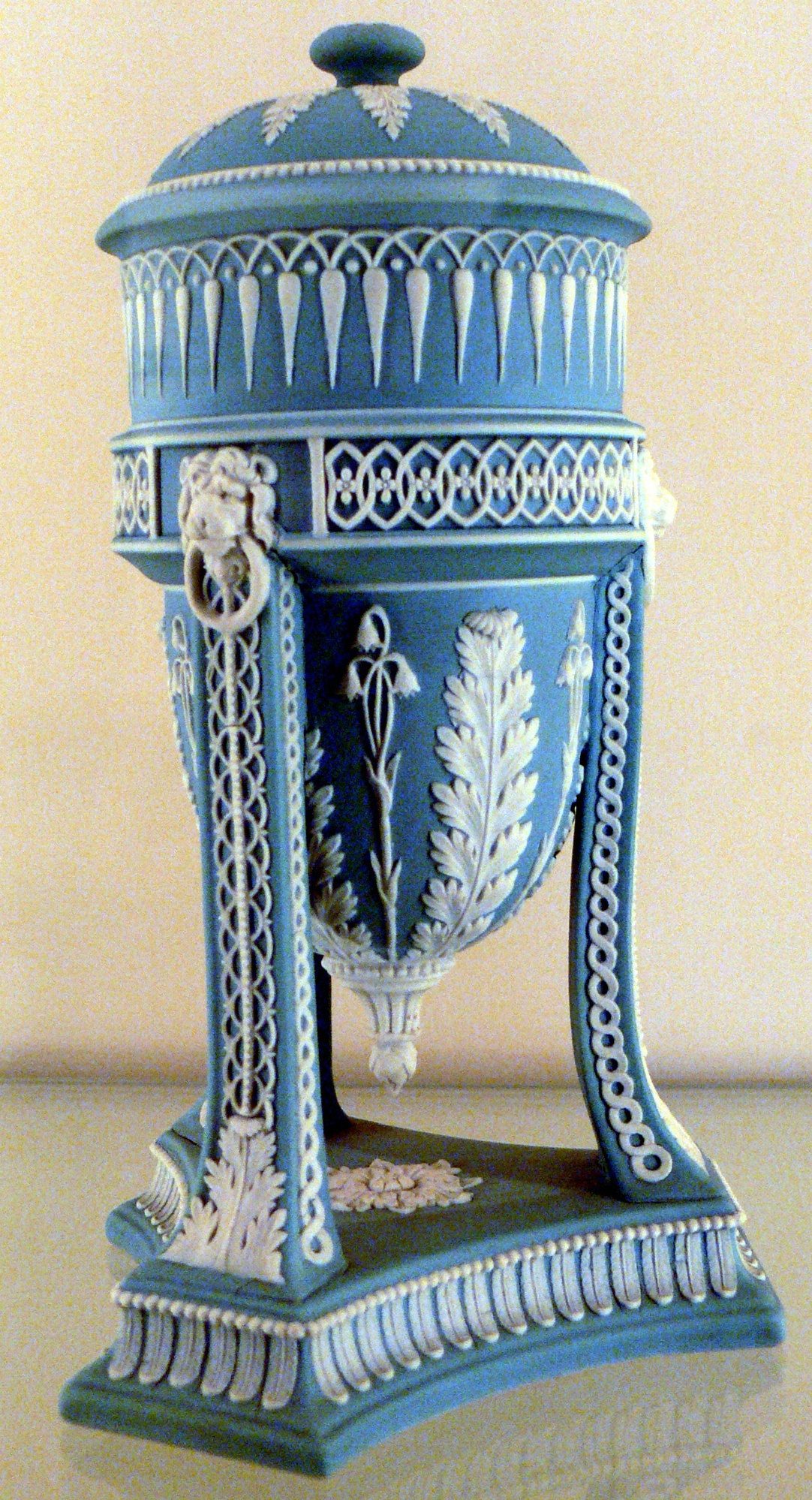
Wedgwood porcelain vase (c. 1820)

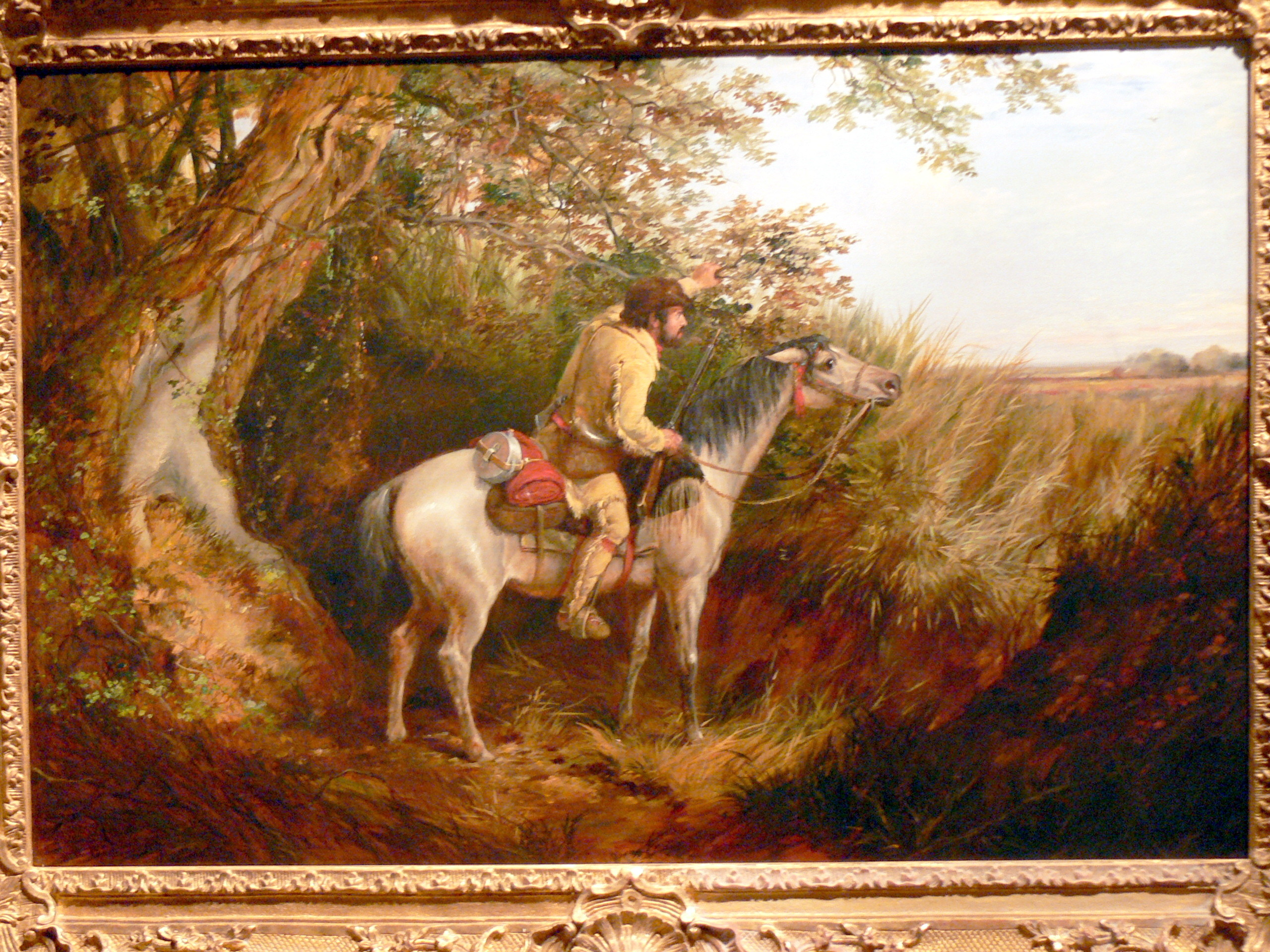
Arthur Fitzwilliam Tait, Trapper Looking Out (1853)

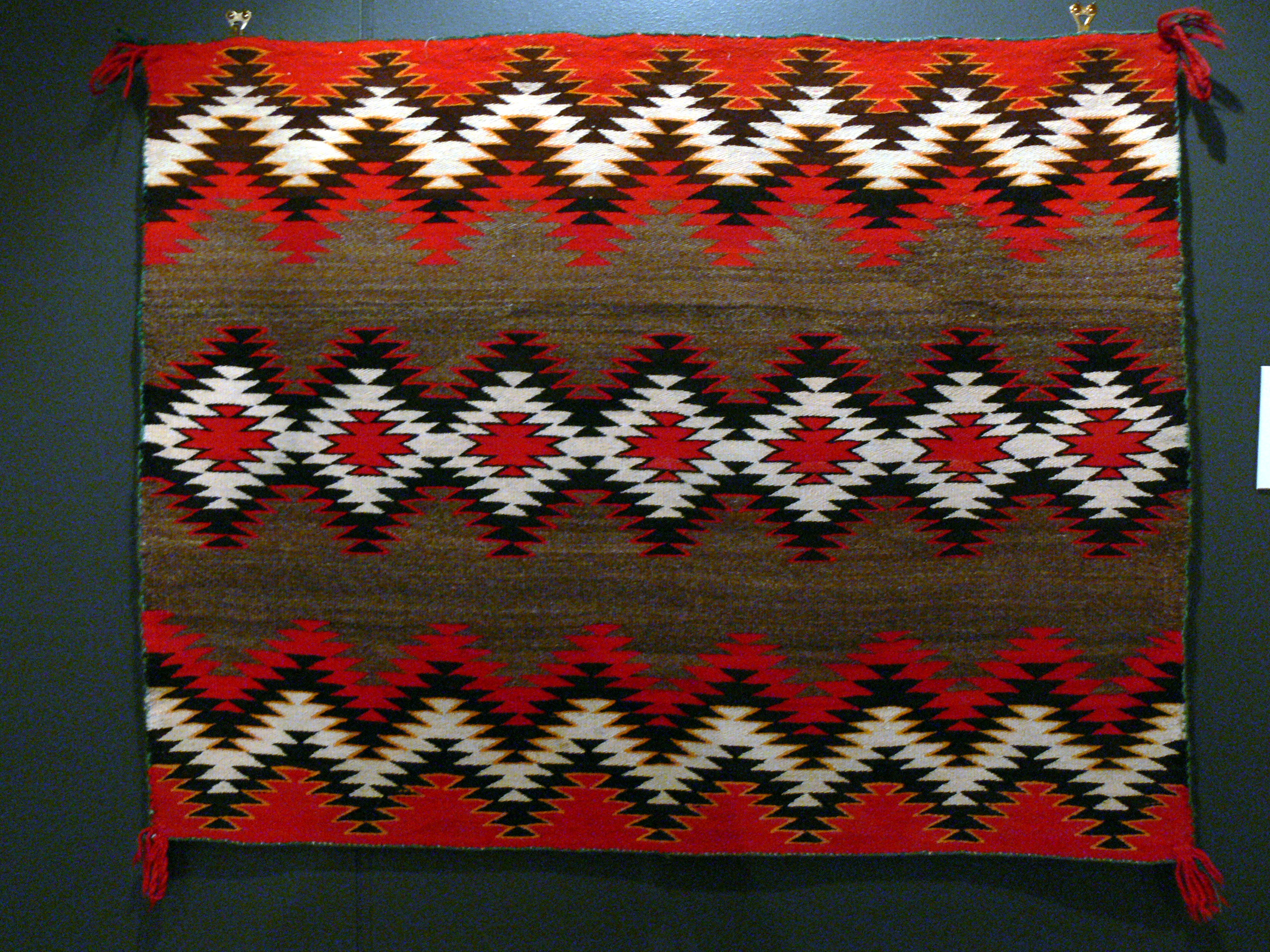
Navajo people single saddle blanket (1880s)

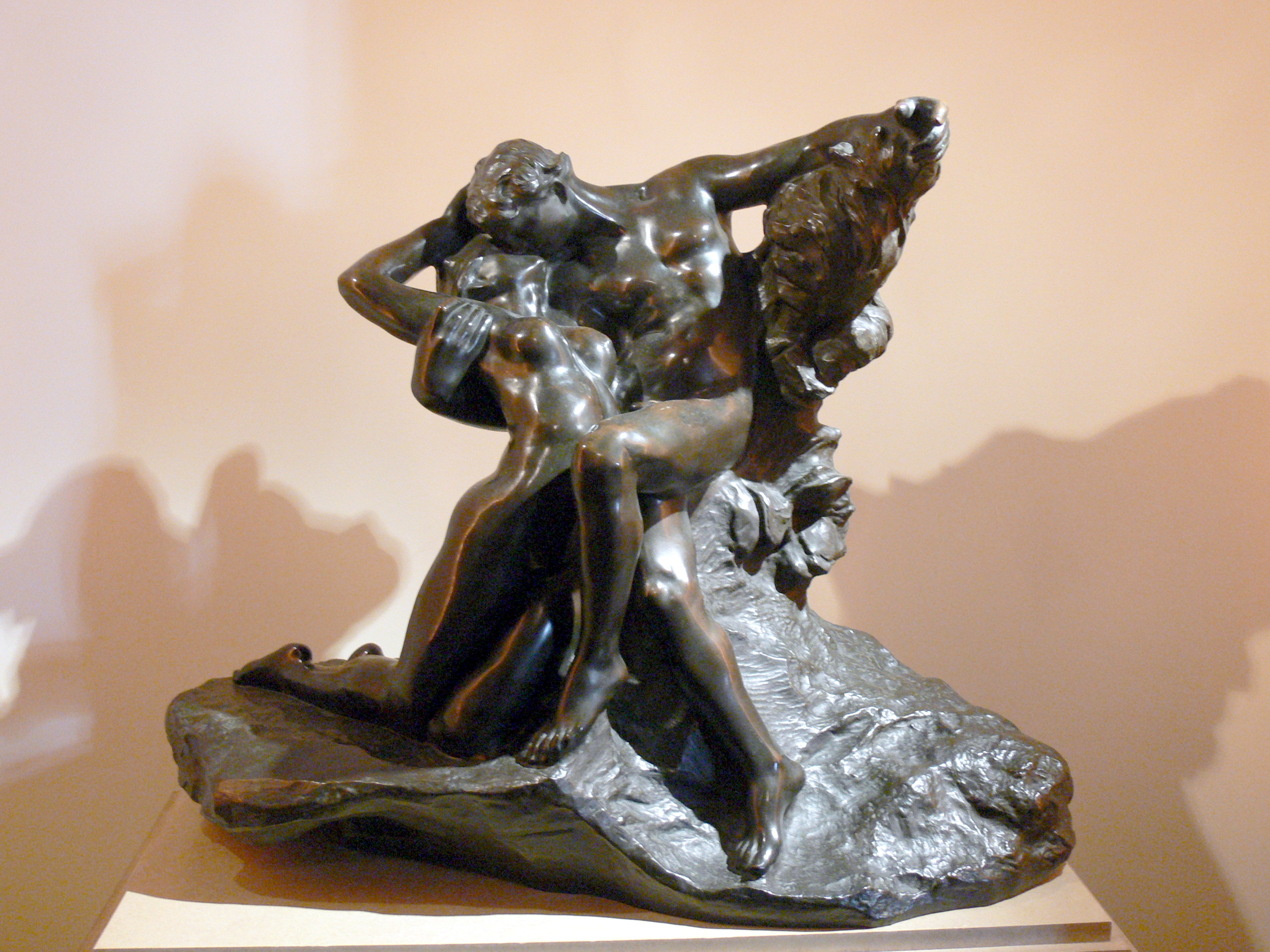
Auguste Rodin, Eternal Springtime (1884)

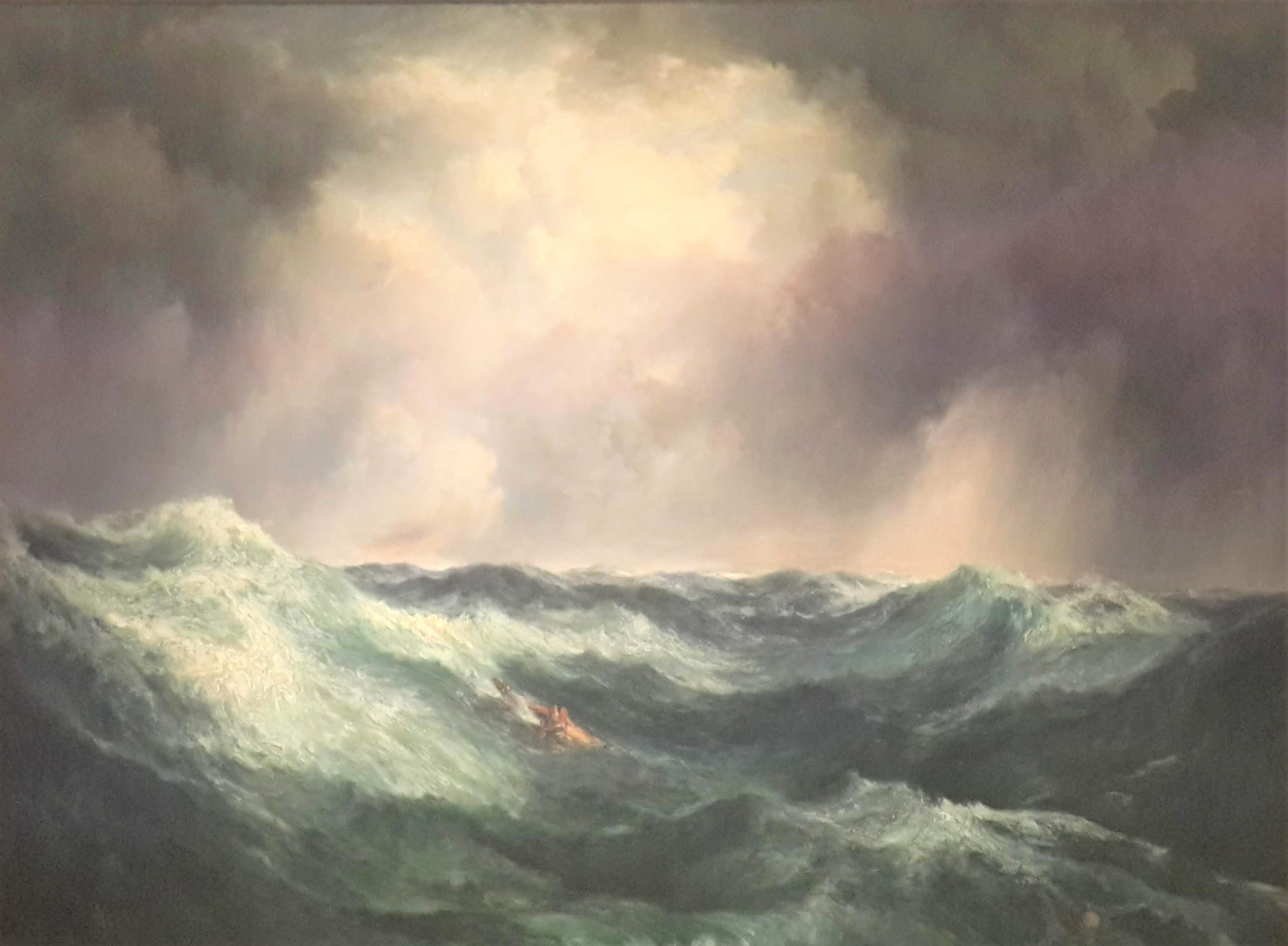
Thomas Moran, An Angry Sea (1887)

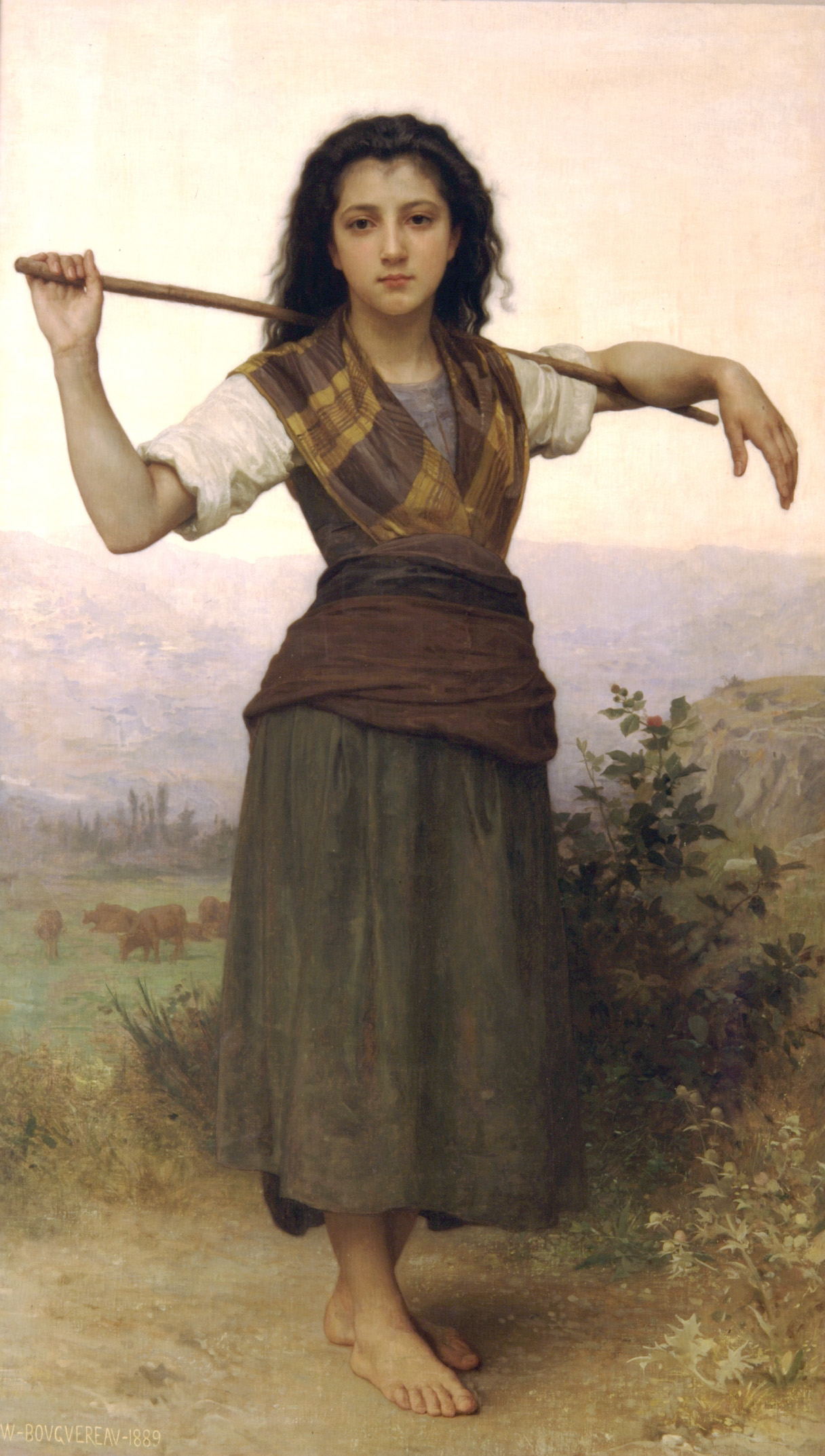
William-Adolphe Bouguereau, The Shepherdess (1889)

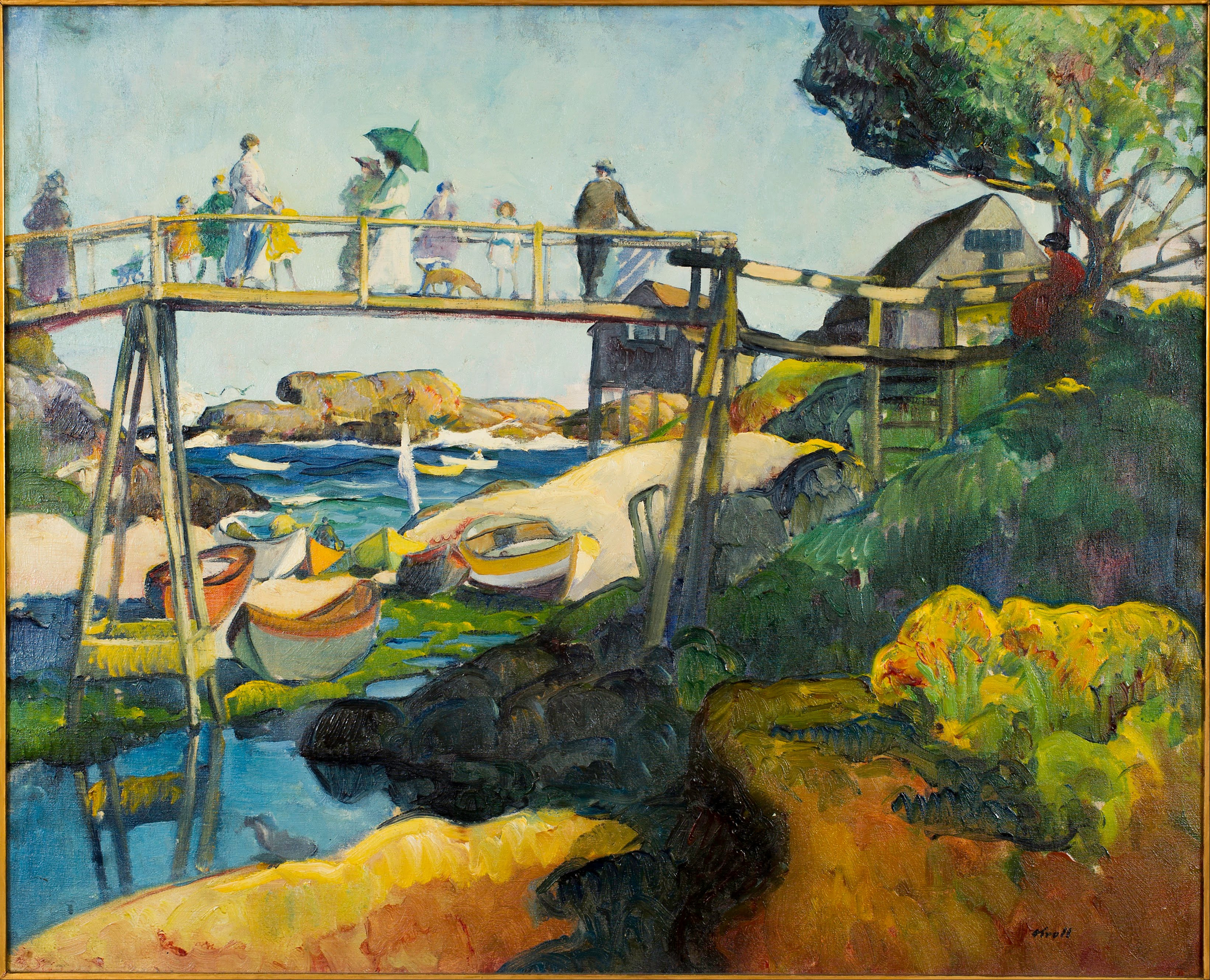
Leon Kroll, The Gay Bridge (1919)

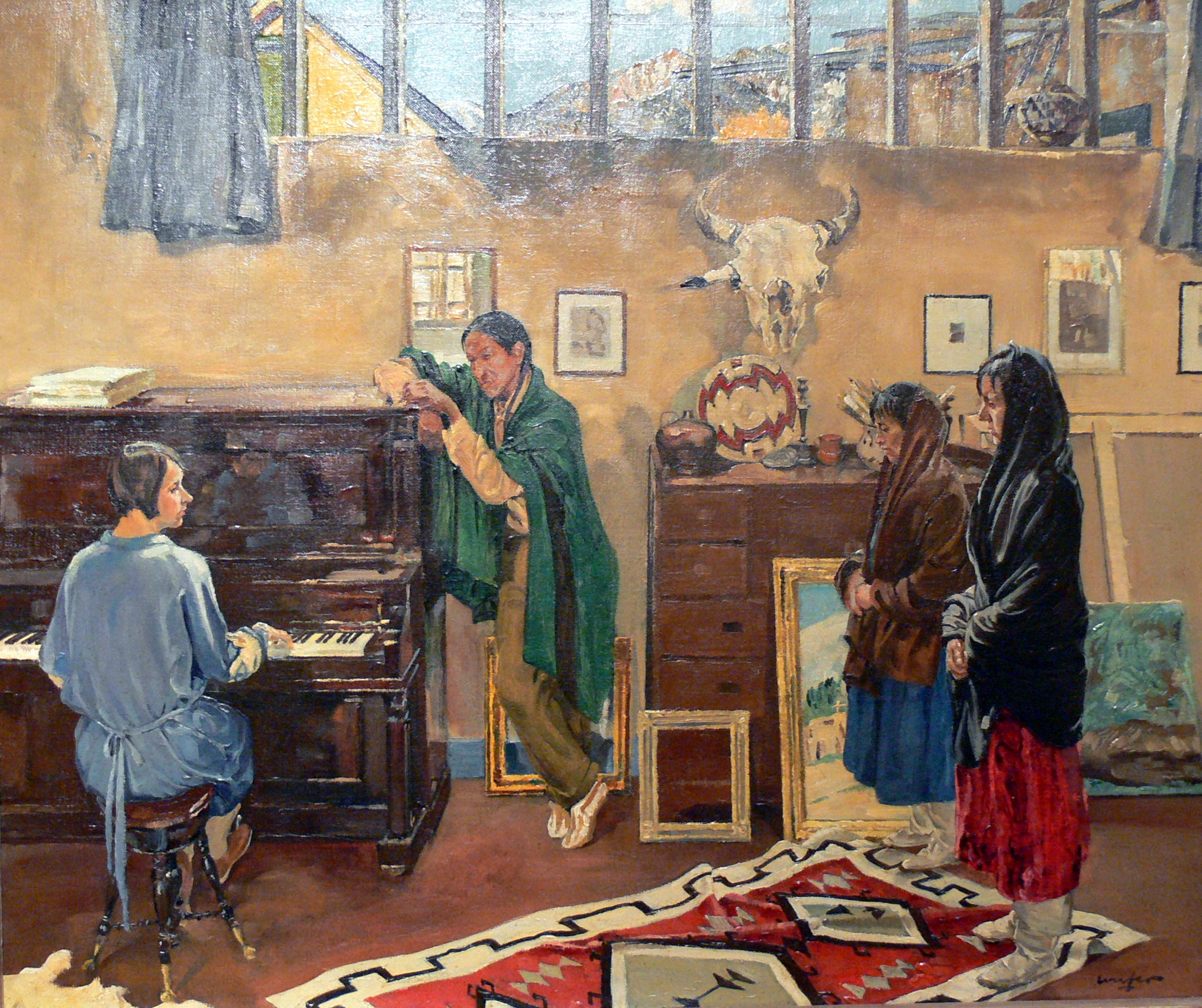
Walter Ufer, The Listeners (1920)

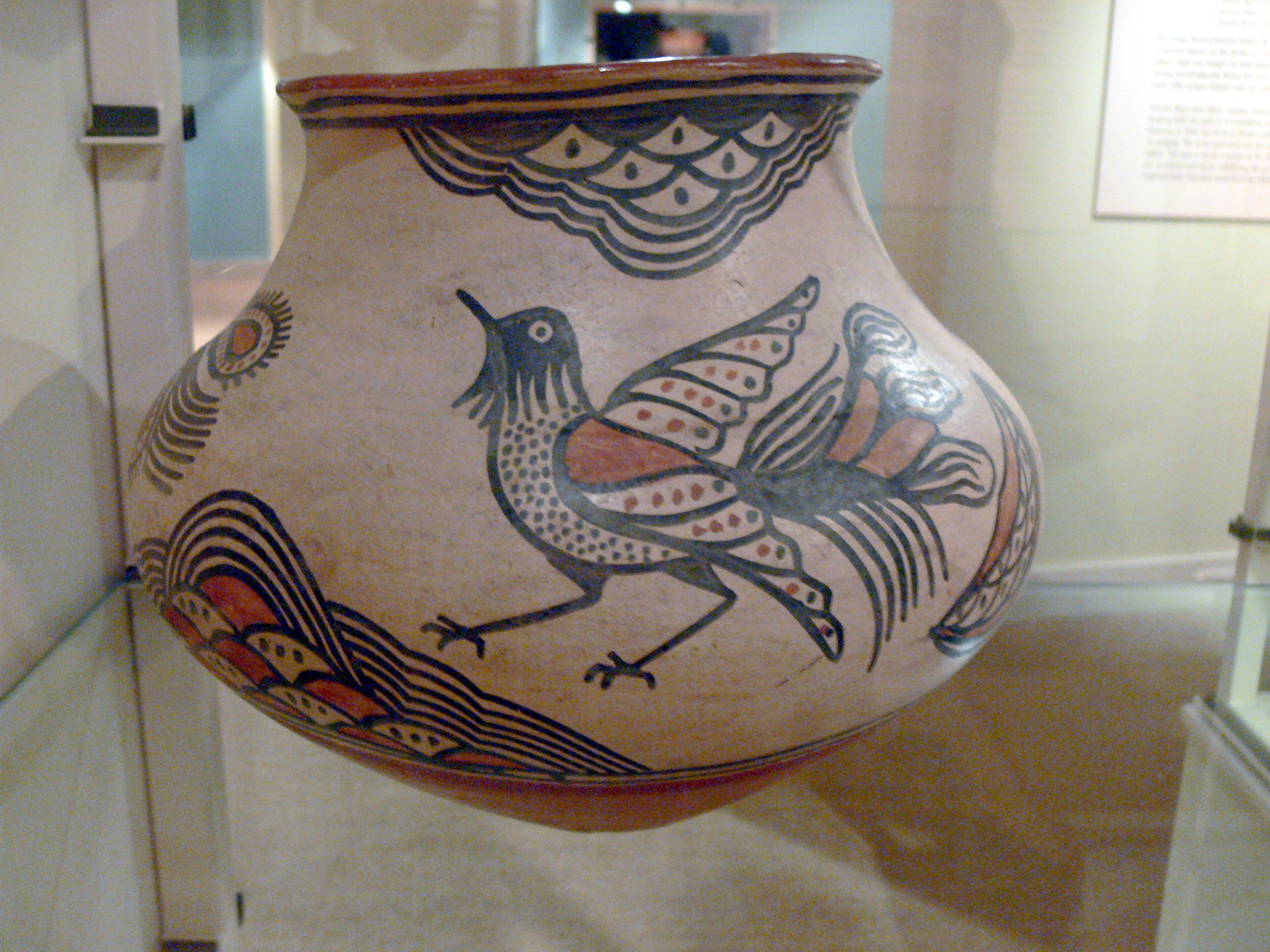
Pueblo people pottery

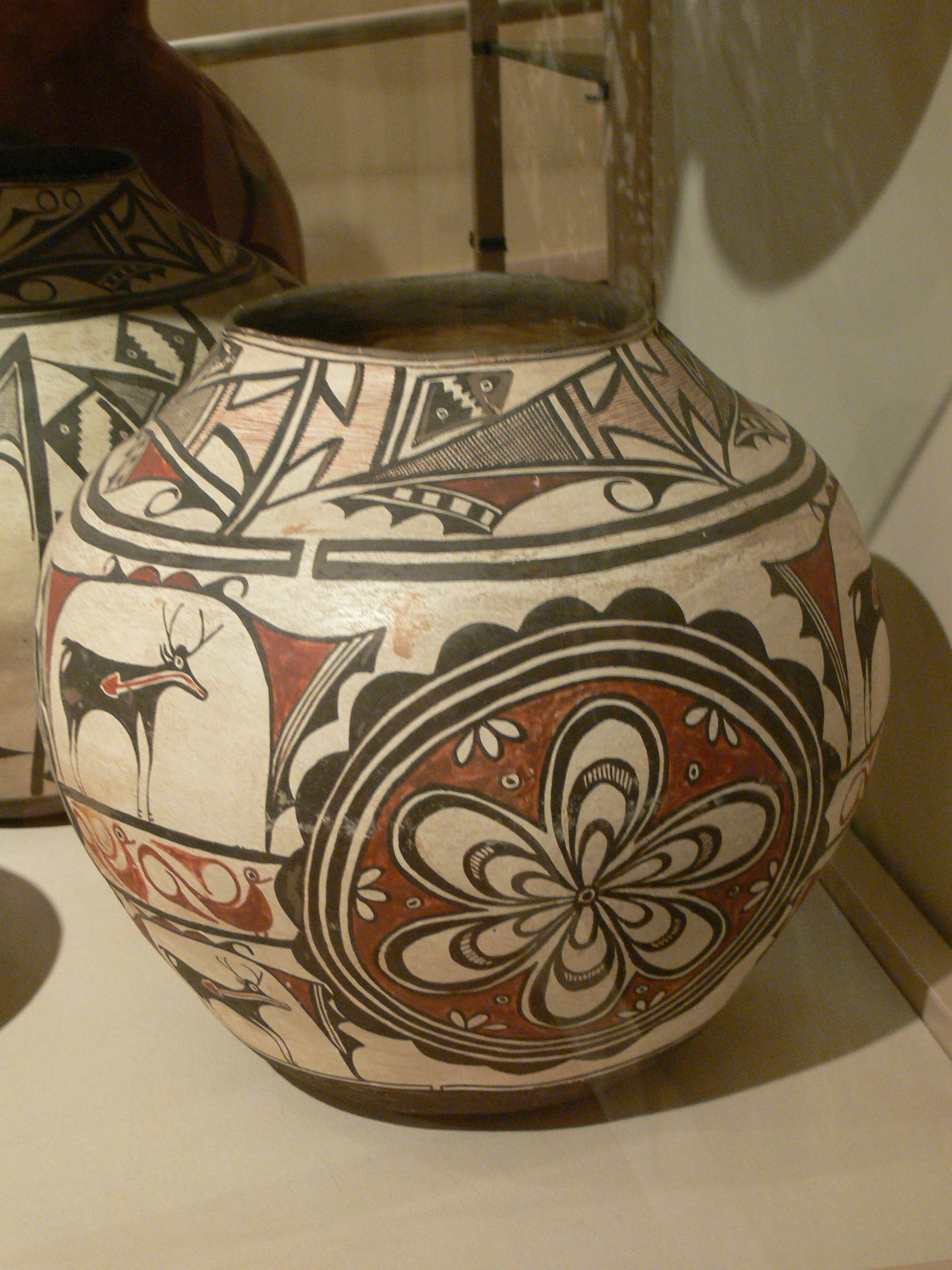
Pueblo people pottery
