= Rand Suffolk =

American art museum director

- Born: Randall Suffolk
- Education: Connecticut College (BA, English); Columbia University (MA, Education); Bryn Mawr College (MA, Art History)
- Occupations: Art museum director, administrator
- Spouse: Susan Weber Suffolk
- Children: 1

Randall "Rand" Suffolk is an American art museum administrator and the director of the High Museum of Art in Atlanta, a position he has held since 2015. Previously, he was director of the Philbrook Museum of Art in Tulsa, Oklahoma, and director of The Hyde Collection in upstate New York.

== Early life and education ==
Suffolk was raised in a rural home in Tallmadge, Ohio. He spent three years of high school in Rome, Italy, where he became fluent in Italian. Suffolk earned a B.A. in English from Connecticut College, a MA in higher education administration from Columbia University, and an MA in Art History from Bryn Mawr College. His masters thesis was on 19th-century Austrian critical theorist Alois Riegl.

== Career ==
Suffolk was hired as a curator at The Hyde Collection in 1995. He was promoted to Deputy Director (1998), Interim Director (1999), and appointed Director in 2000.

In 2007, Suffolk was appointed director of the Philbrook Museum of Art. Between 2007-2015, the museum saw significant increases in attendance and educational program participation and a 22 percent rise in membership. Suffolk also increased the budget, added 2,800 new works to the permanent collection, and oversaw the building of a satellite exhibition space devoted to modern and contemporary art. In 2013, the Philbrook was included in the American Alliance of Museums publication The Art and Science of Engagement.

In 2015, Suffolk was appointed Director of the High Museum of Art. In 2018, he initiated a reinstallation of the permanent collection and expansion of permanent spaces for families. Over ten years, the museum's audiences shifted. In 2015, people of color accounted for 15 percent of museum visitors; in 2024, they comprised 52 percent, mirroring Atlanta's population, and nearly 40 percent of patrons came from households making less than $70,000 a year. Membership also increased, from 26,000 members in 2015 to 41,000 members in 2024. ArtNet used Suffolk's pivot of the High away from the "blockbuster" exhibition model as a case study, arguing that prioritizing community engagement over "blockbusters" can drive greater financial stability for art museums.

=== Mentorship ===
Several individuals who worked for Suffolk have become art museum directors themselves, including: Virginia Shearer(Sarasota Art Museum), Sarah Jesse (Memorial Art Gallery, University of Rochester), Jessimi Jones (Dayton Art Institute), and Brett Abbott (New Britain Museum of American Art).

=== Awards ===
Suffolk is a graduate of the Getty Leadership Institute (2002) and a member of the Association of Art Museum Directors. The Observer named Suffolk one of the Most Influential People in Art in 2024 . Suffolk is also included in Atlanta Magazine's The Atlanta 500: Our City’s Most Powerful Leaders.

== Personal life ==
Suffolk is married to Susan Weber Suffolk. They have one daughter.
