= High Museum of Art =

Art museum in Atlanta, Georgia

- The High Museum of Art in 2026 with Promenade II in the background (left)
- Interactive fullscreen map
- Established: 1926
- Location: 1280 Peachtree Street NE; Atlanta, Georgia
- Coordinates: 33°47′24″N 84°23′08″W
- Type: Art museum
- Director: Randall Suffolk (2015–present)
- Curator: Kevin W. Tucker
- Public transit access: Arts Center station
- Website: high.org

The High Museum of Art (colloquially the High) is the largest museum for visual art in the Southeastern United States. Located in Atlanta, Georgia (on Peachtree Street in Midtown, the city's arts district), the High is 312,000 square feet (28,985 m^{2}) and a division of the Woodruff Arts Center.

The High organizes and presents exhibitions of international and national significance alongside its comprehensive collection of more than 20,000 works of art, and is especially known for its 19th- and 20th-century American decorative arts, folk and self-taught art, modern and contemporary art, and photography. A cultural nexus of Atlanta since 1926, it hosts festivals, live performances, public conversations, independent art films, and educational programs year-round. It also features dedicated spaces for children of all ages and their caregivers, an on-site restaurant, and a museum store.

== History ==
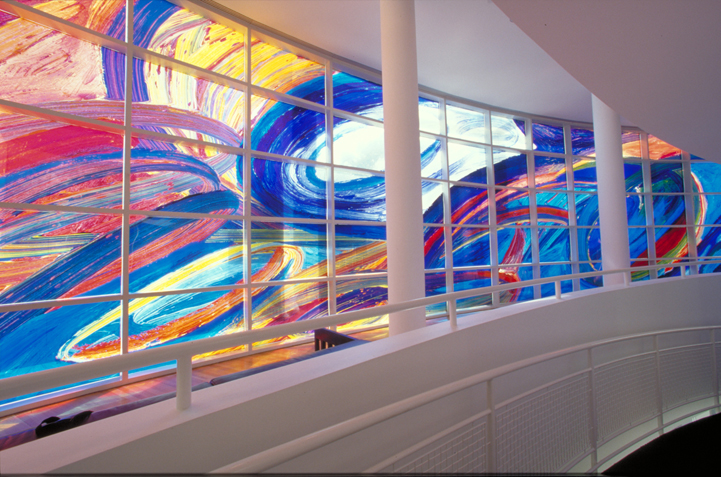
Retracings, a 1999 digital translucent work by Deanna Sirlin

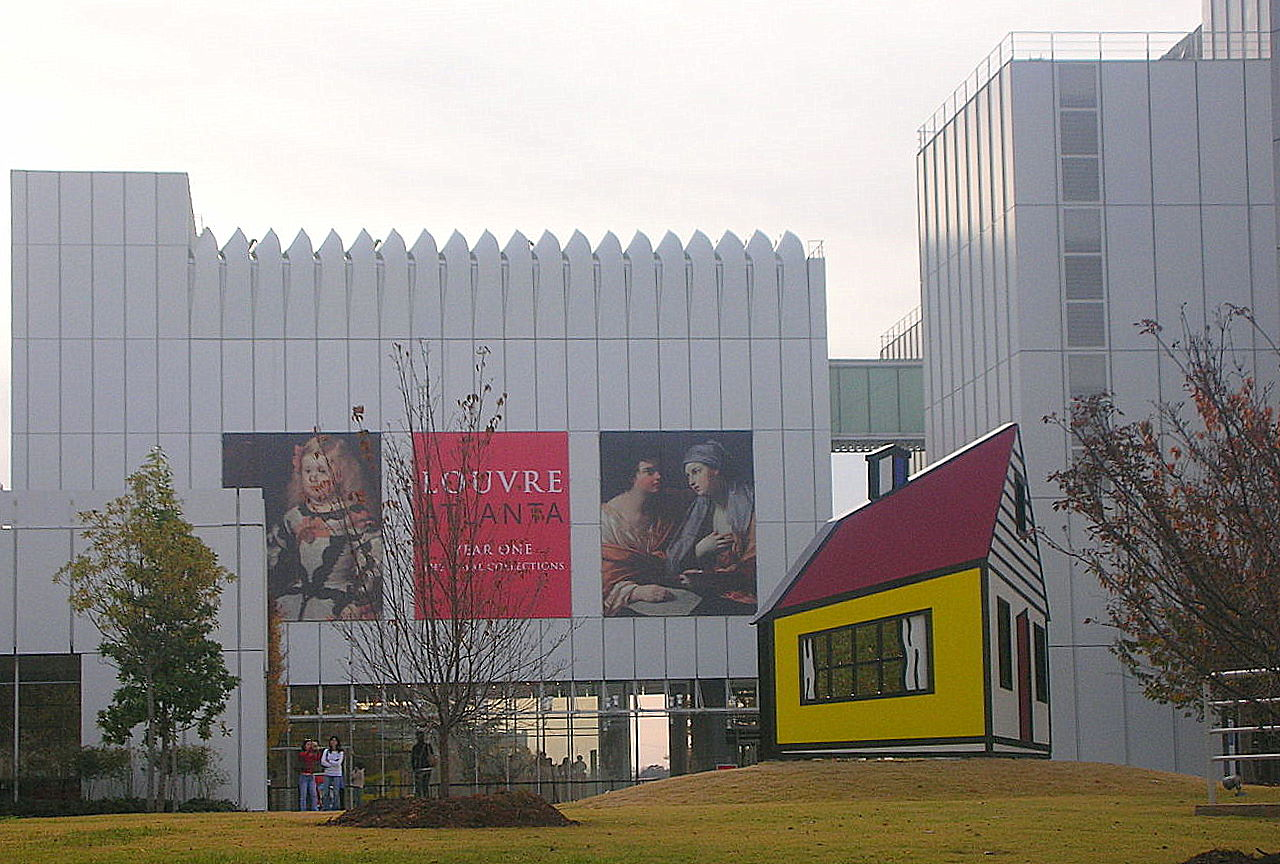
Part of the new addition to the High designed by Renzo Piano

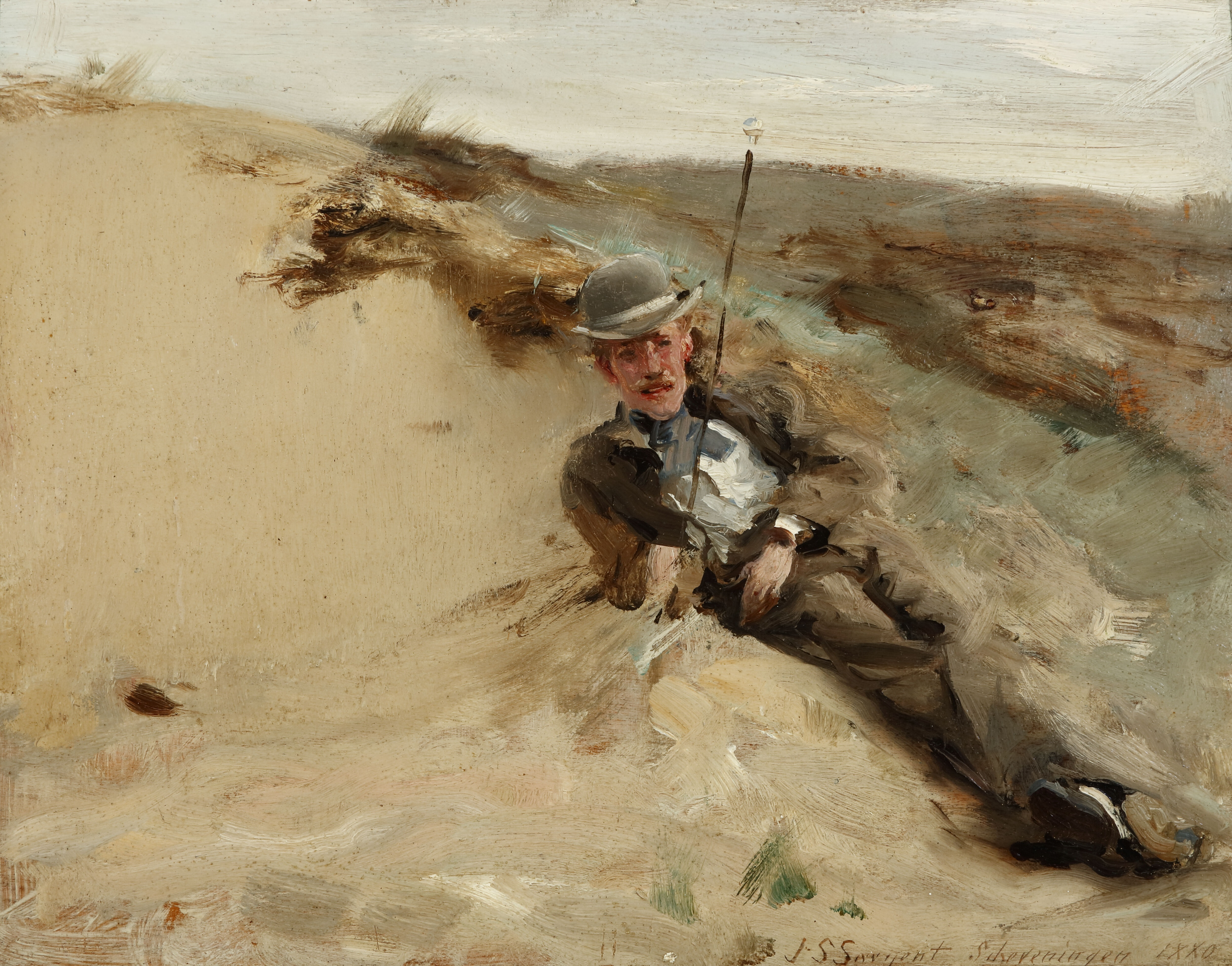
John Singer Sargent, Ralph Curtis on the Beach in Scheveningen, 1880

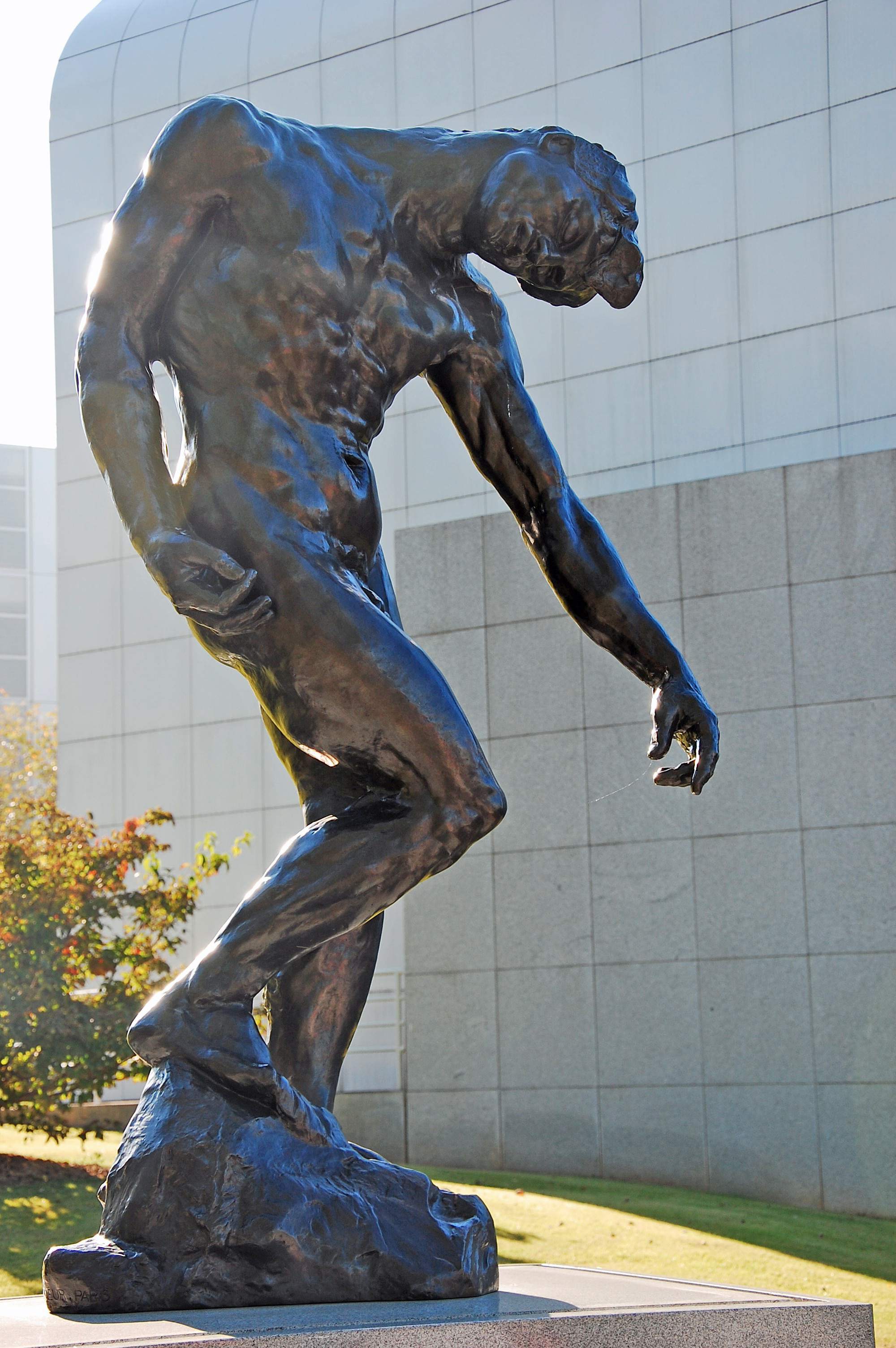
An Auguste Rodin sculpture The Shade, 1880-81, donated to the High by the French government in memory of victims of a plane crash during a museum-sponsored trip in Paris

In 1926, Harriet "Hattie" High donated her home on Peachtree Street to create the museum and school of art that had been the goal of the Atlanta Art Association since 1905. The museum was named in memory of Mrs. High's husband, J.M. High. Leading up to Mrs. High's donation of her home Atlanta art collector J. J. Haverty had organized two exhibitions working with the Grand Central Art Galleries to build interest and support for the creation of an art museum for Atlanta. In 1949 Haverty's daughter donated many pieces from the Haverty collection to the High which are now on permanent display. In 1951 the High was offered a gift from the Kress Foundation of over 30 Renaissance and Baroque works of art if they could promise a climate controlled building. This prompted a building project resulting in a new museum building constructed adjacent to the family home in 1955.

On June 3, 1962, 106 Atlanta arts patrons died in an airplane crash at Paris's Orly Airport while on a museum-sponsored trip. Including crew and other passengers, 130 people were killed in what was, at the time, the worst single plane aviation disaster in history. Members of Atlanta's prominent families were lost including members of the Berry family who founded Berry College. During their visit to Paris, the Atlanta arts patrons had seen Whistler's Mother at the Louvre. In the winter of 1963, the Louvre, as a gesture of good will to the people of Atlanta, sent Whistler's Mother to Atlanta to be exhibited at the Atlanta Art Association museum on Peachtree Street.

To honor those killed in the 1962 crash, the Atlanta Memorial Arts Center was built which included the Atlanta Symphony Orchestra, the High Museum of Art, the Atlanta College of Art, and later the Alliance Theater. The French government donated a Rodin sculpture The Shade to the High in memory of the victims of the crash.

As part of the 1996 Summer Olympics, the museum offered an exhibit called Rings: Five Passions in World Art, themed around five emotions: love, joy, awe, anguish, and triumph. Curated by J. Carter Brown, it highlighted paintings and sculptures from the US National Gallery of Art and museums from around the world.

Today the High Museum has an audience that is younger than the average art museum audience, whose income levels are diverse, and that is fifty percent people of color, paralleling the city of Atlanta's racial demographics.

== Architecture ==
In 1983, a 135,000-square-foot (12,500 m^{2}) building designed by Richard Meier opened to house the High Museum of Art. Meier won the 1984 Pritzker Prize after completing the building. The Meier building was funded by a $7.9 million challenge grant from former Coca-Cola president Robert W. Woodruff matched by $20 million raised by the museum. The building contains 135,000 square feet with about 52,000 square feet (4,800 m^{2}) of gallery space.

In 2005, Renzo Piano designed three new buildings which more than doubled the museum's size to 312,000 square feet (29,000 m^{2}), at a cost of $124 million. The Piano buildings were designed as part of an overall upgrade of the entire Woodruff Arts Center complex. All three new buildings erected as part of the expansion of the High are clad in panels of aluminum to align with Meier's original choice of a white enamel façade. Piano's design of the new Wieland Pavilion and Anne Cox Chambers Wing features a special roof system of 1,000 light scoops that capture northern light and filter it into the skyway galleries.

In 2018 the Museum hired the New York-based architecture firm of Annabelle Selldorf to design a reinstallation of its collection galleries across the Meier and Piano buildings. The work included a new system of gallery organization, lighting systems, and exhibition furnishings to create a more closely integrated series of collection experiences across the Museum’s various curatorial departments.

== Collection ==
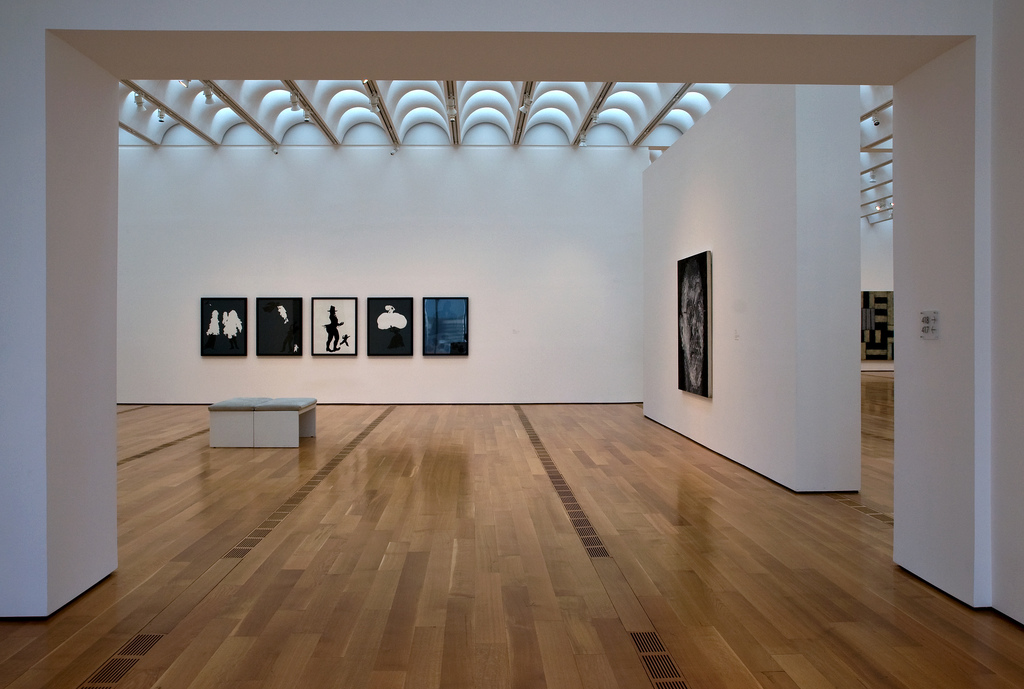
The interior of the High

The High Museum of Art's permanent collection includes more than 20,000 artworks across seven collecting areas: African art, American art, decorative arts and design, European art, folk and self-taught art, modern and contemporary art, and photography. More than one-third of the High's collection was acquired after the museum announced its plans for expansion in 1999. Highlights of the collection include works by Giovanni Battista Tiepolo, Claude Monet, Martin Johnson Heade, Dorothea Lange, Clarence John Laughlin, and Chuck Close.

=== African art ===
The High’s African art collection includes a wide range of art forms dating from ancient to contemporary times. To represent the breadth of the African diaspora, the High curates works by artists of African ancestry, including African American artists, to highlight cultural Black connections throughout the world.

The heart of the African art collection consists of masks and figurative sculptures, enriched by exceptionally fine textiles, beadwork, metalwork, and ceramics. Antiquities include an animated terracotta sculpture of a female torso wrapped in snakes (c. 1200–1500). From the region of ancient Djenné, one of Africa’s oldest cities, this work represents Sogolon, mother of Sundiata, the founder of the Mali Empire. Along with this work, a Quran (c. 1600) from Timbuktu, Djenné’s sister city, highlights art of the Mali Empire.

=== American art ===
The Museum’s American art collection includes more than 1,200 paintings, sculptures, drawings, and prints made by American artists between 1780 and 1980. With particular strengths in historic American sculpture and painting, the collection demonstrates the evolution of a distinctly American point of view in artistic representation.

From early American portraiture to the splendor of the Gilded Age, the High’s nineteenth-century collection includes works by John Singleton Copley, Benjamin West, Eastman Johnson, Sanford Robinson Gifford, Frederick Kensett, John Henry Twachtman, Harriet Hosmer, Edmonia Lewis, Henry Ossawa Tanner, Mary Cassatt, and John Singer Sargent. The High also holds works by America’s most progressive artists of the modern age, from the Stieglitz Circle and abstract painters, to artists concerned with social justice and reform, to those rooted in the American art scene.

=== Decorative arts and design ===
The decorative arts and design collection explores the merging of function and aesthetics through form, material, process, place, and intent. It features the renowned Virginia Carroll Crawford Collection—the most comprehensive survey of nineteenth- and early twentieth-century American decorative arts in the southeastern United States—with important works by Alexander Roux, Herter Brothers, Tiffany & Co., Marquand & Co., and Frank Lloyd Wright. Other notable gifts include the Frances and Emory Cocke Collection of English Ceramics from 1640 to 1840.

The collection’s international contemporary design holdings recently have expanded with the addition of significant works by Joris Laarman Lab, Jaime Hayon, Ron Arad, and nendo. With more than 2,300 objects dating from 1640 to the present, the collection explores the intersections between art, craft, and design; handcraft and technology; and innovation and making.

=== European art ===
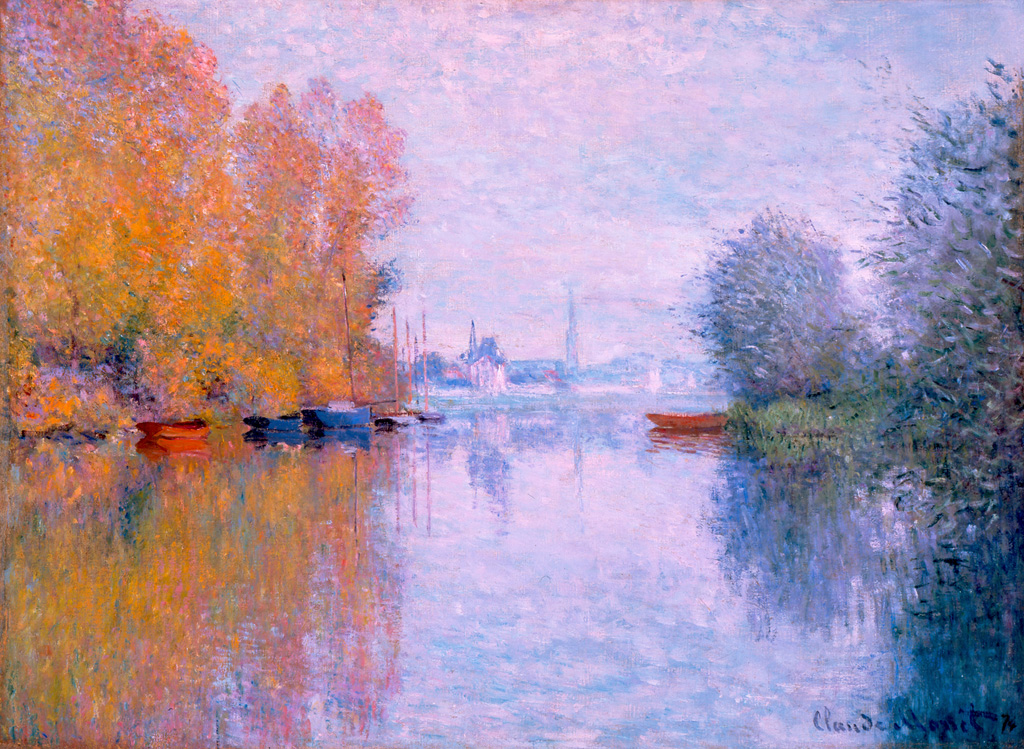
Autumn on the Seine, Argenteuil by Claude Monet, 1873

This collection represents seven centuries of artistic achievement throughout Europe. The High’s holdings of more than 1,000 paintings, sculptures, and works on paper span the 1300s through the 1900s and trace the development of religion, scientific discovery, and social change through the lens of the continent’s visual culture.

In 1958, the Samuel H. Kress Foundation donated what became the core of the High’s European art collection. The Kress Collection includes Giovanni Bellini’s Madonna and Child, Vittore Carpaccio’s Prudence and Temperance, and other artworks from Renaissance and Baroque Europe. Since then, the High’s European collection has grown to represent most major art movements and styles, exemplified by paintings and sculptures of such masters as Nicolas Tournier, Guercino (Jesus and the Samaritan Woman at the Well), Jan Breughel the Elder, Giovanni Battista Tiepolo, Charles-Joseph Natoire, Anne-Louis Girodet-Trioson (The Burial of Atala), Camille Corot, Jean-Joseph Carriès (Sleeping Faun), and Auguste Rodin (Eternal Spring).

Today, the European collection is especially rich in French Impressionist and Post-Impressionist paintings, many of which came as a gift in 2019 from Atlanta collectors Doris and Shouky Shaheen. The holdings include Claude Monet’s 1873 Autumn of the Seine; Argenteuil, a rare seascape by Frédéric Bazille, and Henri Matisse’s Woman Seated at the Piano, as well as paintings by Eugène Boudin, Camille Pissarro, Alfred Sisley, Pierre-Auguste Renoir, Henri Fantin-Latour, Émile Bernard, Édouard Vuillard, and others.

The High’s significant European print holdings, displayed on a rotating basis, include work ranging from Albrecht Dürer’s sixteenth-century engravings to a complete edition of Henri de Toulouse-Lautrec’s Elles portfolio of lithographs.

=== Folk and self-taught art ===
The High Museum began collecting the work of living self-taught artists in 1975 and was the first general interest museum to establish a dedicated department for folk and self-taught art in 1994. This collection is especially rich in artworks by Southern and African American artists and features the largest groups of work by Bill Traylor, Howard Finster, Nellie Mae Rowe, and Thornton Dial held by any museum.

Although the majority of these artists could be identified as American or contemporary, the High refers to them as “folk,” which underscores their status as artists of the people, or “self-taught,” to emphasize that they were not formally trained.

=== Modern and contemporary art ===
Modern and contemporary art at the High traces the development of innovative visual languages since 1945 that have influenced how people perceive, understand, and interpret the world, its histories, and human experience.

Modern and contemporary art at the High Museum includes outstanding examples of work by seminal artists, those just entering the canon, and emerging artists. The collection prominently features multiple works by artists such as Radcliffe Bailey, Alex Katz, and Ellsworth Kelly as well as a growing collection of significant individual works by artists including Michaël Borremans, Alfredo Jaar, Anish Kapoor, KAWS, Julie Mehretu, Judy Pfaff, Sarah Sze, and Kara Walker, with a special focus on work by African American artists.

=== Photography ===
The High began collecting photographs in the early 1970s, making it among the earliest museums to commit to the medium. Today, the photography department is one of the nation’s leading programs and, with some 7,500 prints, comprises the Museum’s largest collection.

These holdings encompass work from around the world made by diverse practitioners, from artists, to entrepreneurs, to journalists, to scientists. Spanning the very beginnings of the medium in the 1840s to the present, the High’s collection has particular strengths in American modernist and documentary traditions from the mid-twentieth century as well as current contemporary trends.

The photography collection maintains a strong base of pictures related to the American South and situates this work within a global context that is both regionally relevant and internationally significant. The High owns one of the largest collections of photographs of the civil rights movement and some of the country’s largest monographic collections of photographs by Eugene Atget, Dawoud Bey, Isla Bing, Wynn Bullock, Lucinda Bunnen, Harry Callahan, William Christenberry, Walker Evans, Leonard Freed, Evelyn Hofer, Clarence John Laughlin, Abelardo Morell, and Peter Sekaer.

The collection also gives special attention to pictures made in and of the South, serving as the largest and most significant repository representing the region's important contributions to the history of photography. Since 1996, the High's distinctive "Picturing the South" initiative has commissioned established and emerging photographers to produce work inspired by the area's geographical and cultural landscape. Past participants include Sally Mann, Dawoud Bey, Emmet Gowin, Alex Webb, Alec Soth, Richard Misrach, Kael Alford and Debbie Fleming Caffery, whose commissions have all been added to the High's permanent collection.

== Exhibitions ==
Changing exhibitions at the High place emphasis upon the Museum’s collections across all of its curatorial departments and include nationally touring projects as well as international collaborations with other museums. Recent touring exhibitions organized by the High include key projects from its important holdings of folk and self-taught art, photography, and decorative arts and design, among other areas. Other projects hosted at the High included the popular Yayoi Kusama: Infinity Mirrors as well as Virgil Abloh: “Figures of Speech.” Earlier global partnerships with other museums included that with the Louvre and with the Opera di Santa Maria del Fiore and the Opificio delle pietre dure in Florence. The museum secured a US$18 million deal for Louvre Atlanta, a three-year (2006-2009) revolving loan of art from the Musée du Louvre in Paris.

In 2025, the museum became the first art museum in the United States to hold an exhibition on South Korean painter Kim Chong Hak.

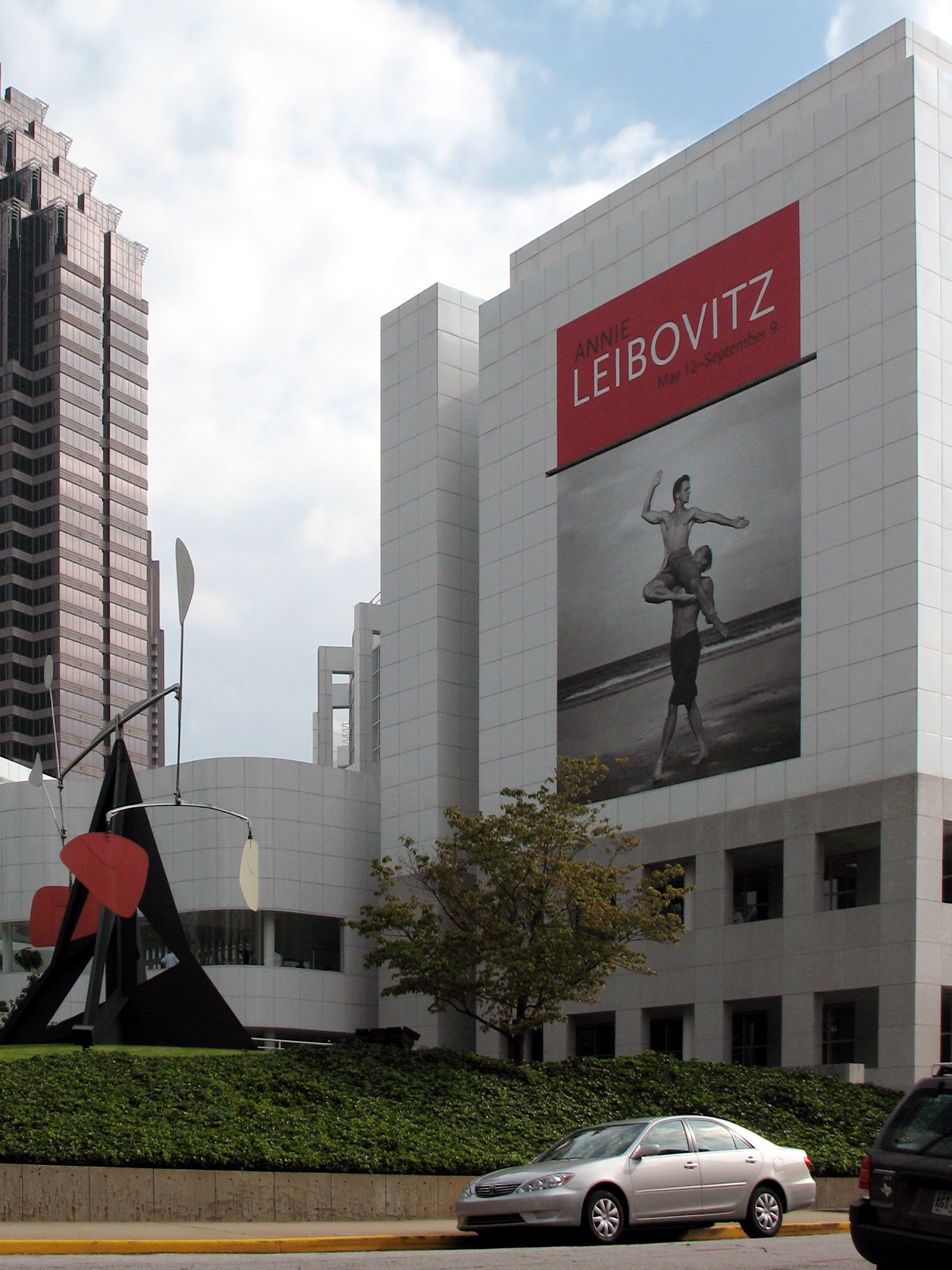
Signs for the Annie Leibovitz exhibit at the High Museum of Art

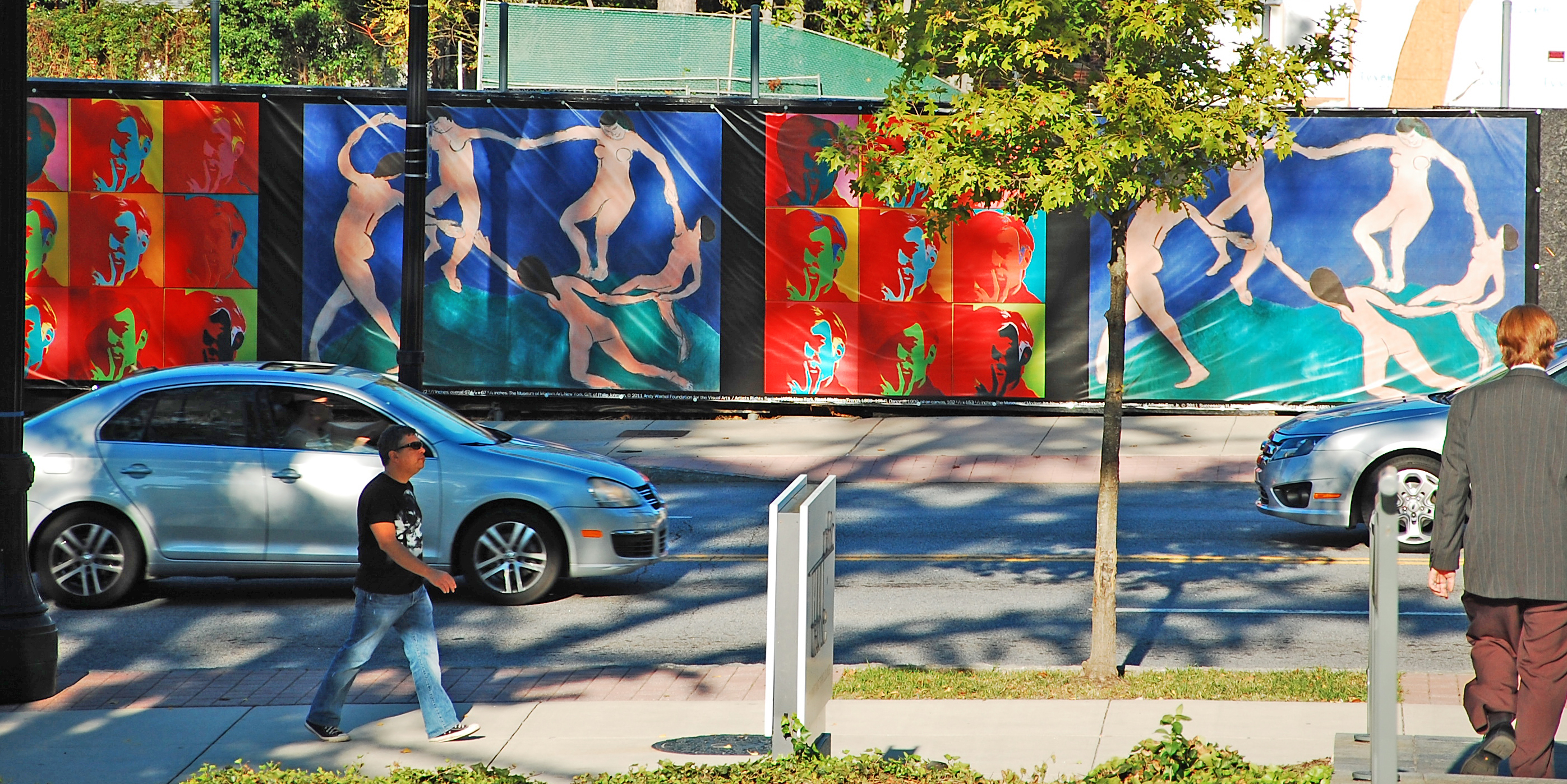
Across from the High during the "Picasso to Warhol" exhibit

=== Selected exhibitions ===
- 1983 - 1988: Sensation
- October 2007 – September 2008: Louvre Atlanta: The Louvre and the Ancient World
- October 2007 – May 2008: Louvre Atlanta: Eye of Josephine
- December 2007 – August 2008: Street Life: American Photographs form the 1960s and 70s
- May 2008 – August 2008: Young Americans: Photographs by Sheila Pree Bright
- June 2008 – September 2008: Louvre Atlanta: Houdon at the Louvre: Masterworks of the Enlightenment
- June 2008 – October 2008: Road to Freedom: Photographs from the Civil Rights Movement, 1956–1968
- June 2008 – October 2008: After 1968: Contemporary Artists and the Civil Rights Legacy
- November 2008: The First Emperor: China's Terracotta Army
- 2008: Medieval and Renaissance Treasures from the Victoria and Albert Museum
- 2008: Louvre Atlanta: The Louvre and the Masterpiece
- 2008: The Treasure of Ulysses Davis
- April 2009: Anthony Ames, Architect: Residential Landscapes
- October 2009 – February 2010: Leonardo da Vinci: The Hand of the Genius
- 2009: Monet "Water Lilies" Exhibit
- March 2010 – June 2010: The Allure of the Automobile
- August 2010 – January 2011: Dali: The Late Work
- October 2011 – April 2012: Picasso to Warhol – modern art including Picasso, Pollock, Matisse, Mondrian, and Warhol.
- June 2012 – September 2012: Picturing the South – photographs by Martin Parr, Kael Alford, and Shane Lavalette
- February 2013 – May 2013: Frida and Diego: Passion, Politics, and Painting – featuring art from Frida Kahlo and Diego Rivera
- June 2013 – September 2013: The Girl with the Pearl Earring: Dutch Paintings from the Mauritshuis – featuring art from Vermeer and Rembrandt
- November 2013 – January 2014: The Art of the Louvre's Tuileries Garden
- November 2013 – April 2014: Go West! Art of the American Frontier
- February 2014 – May 2014: Abelardo Morell: The Universe Next Door
- May 2014 – September 2014: Dream Cars: Innovative Design, Visionary Ideas
- July 2014 – November 2014: Mi Casa, Your Casa
- October 2014 – January 2015: Cezanne and the Modern
- November 2014 – June 2015: Gordon Parks: Segregation Story
- February 2015 – May 2015: Imagining New Worlds: Wifredo Lam, José Parlá and Fahamu Pecou
- April 2015 – November 2015: Los Trompos
- May 2015 – January 2016: Seriously Silly! The art & whimsy of Mo Willems
- June 2015 – September 2015: Alex Katz, This Is Now
- July 2015 – October 2015: Sprawl! Drawing Outside the Lines
- October 2015 – January 2016: Habsburg Splendor: Masterpieces from Vienna's Imperial Collections
- November 2015 – June 2016: Iris van Herpen: Transforming Fashion
- February 2016 – August 2016: Vik Muniz
- March 2016 – January 2017: I See a Story: The Art of Eric Carle
- June 2016 – August 2016: The Rise of Sneaker Culture
- June 2016 – September 2016: Walker Evans: Depth of Field
- June 2016 – November 2016: Tiovivo: Whimsical Sculptures by Jaime Hayon
- October 2016 – January 2017: Fever Within: The Art of Ronald Lockett
- October 2016 – January 2017: Thomas Struth: Nature & Politics
- February 2017 – May 2017: Cross Country: The Power of Place in American Art, 1915−1950
- November 2016 – July 2017: A Conspiracy of Icons: The Art of Donald Locke
- March 2017 – May 2017: Daniel Arsham: Hourglass
- March 2017 – June 2017: The Spirit of the Place: Photographs by Jack Leigh
- April 2017 – January 2018: Painter and Poet: The Wonderful World of Ashley Bryan
- June 2017 – October 2017: Technicolor
- June 2017 – October 2017: Paul Graham: The Whiteness of the Whale
- June 2017 – October 2017: Universal and Sublime: The Vessels of Magdalene Odundo
- June 2017 – November 2017: Merry Go Zoo
- June 2017 – December 2017: Andy Warhol: Prints from the Collections of Jordan D. Schnitzer and His Family Foundation
- September 2017 – April 2019: Amy Elkins: Black Is the Day, Black Is the Night
- October 2017 – January 2018: Making Africa: A Continent of Contemporary Design
- November 2017 – April 2018: “A Fire That No Water Could Put Out”: Civil Rights Photography
- November 2017 – March 2018: Al Taylor, What Are You Looking At?
- February 2018 – May 2018: Joris Laarman Lab: Design In the Digital Age
- March 2018 – June 2018: Mark Steinmetz: Terminus
- June 2018 – September 2018: Winnie-The-Pooh: Exploring a Classic
- June 2018 – September 2018: Outliers and American Vanguard Art
- June 2018 – October 2018: Sonic Playground: Yuri Suzuki
- September 2018 – February 2019: With Drawn Arms: Glenn Kaino and Tommie Smith
- October 2018 – April 2018: William Christenberry: Time & Texture
- November 2018 – February 2019: Yayoi Kusama: Infinity Mirrors
- October 2018 – April 2019: Look Again: 45 Years of Collecting Photography
- October 2018 – August 2019: Hand to Hand: Southern Craft of the 19th Century
- March 2019 – May 2019: Way Out There: The Art of Southern Backroads
- April 2019 – July 2019: European Masterworks: The Phillips Collection
- May 2019 – November 2019: Strange Light: The Photography of Clarence John Laughlin
- June 2019 – September 2019: The Pursuit of Everything: Maira Kalman’s Books for Children
- June 2019 – September 20119: Of Origins and Belonging, Drawn from Atlanta
- July 2019 – September 2019: Supple Means of Connection
- September 2019 – February 2020: "Something Over Something Else: Romare Bearden's Profile Series
- October 2019 – December 2019: Sally Mann: A Thousand Crossings
- October 2019 – March 2020: Fine Lines: American Works on Paper
- November 2019 – March 2020: Virgil Abloh: "Figures of Speech"
- November 2019 – May 2020: Our Strange New Land: Photographs by Alex Harris
- February 2020 – July 2020: The Plot Thickens: Storytelling in European Print Series
- February 2020 – August 2020: Paa Joe: Gates of No Return
- July 2020 – February 2021: Murmuration
- August 2020 – November 2020: Picture the Dream: The Story of the Civil Rights Movement through Children's Books
- October 2020 – January 2021: Julie Mehretu
- November 2020 – March 2021: Dawoud Bey: An American Project
- December 2020 – April 2021: Bestowing Beauty: Masterpieces from Persian Lands
- February 2021 – May 2021: David Driskell: Icons of Nature and History
- March 2021 – May 2021: Ragnar Kjartannsson: The Visitors
- April 2021 – August 2021: Underexposed: Women Photographers from the Collection
- April 2021 – August 2021: Our Good Earth: Rural Life and American Art
- June 2021 – September 2021: Calder-Picasso
- July 2021 – September 2021: Electrifying Design: A Century of Lighting
- July 2021 – November 2021: Outside the Lines
- August 2021 – December 2021: Gatecrashers: The Rise of the Self-Taught Artist in America
- September 2021 – January 2022: Really Free: The Radical Art of Nellie Mae Rowe
- November 2021 – February 2022: Picturing the South: 25 Years
- December 2021 – March 2022: KAWS Prints
- December 2021 – April 2022: Disrupting Design: Modern Posters, 1900-1940
- January 2022 – March 2022: The Obama Portraits Tour
- February 2022 – May 2022: André Kertész: Postcards from Paris
- March 2022 – August 2022: What Is Left Unspoken, Love
- April 2022 – August 2022: Oliver Jeffers: 15 Years of Picturing Books
- October 2022 — January 2023: Rodin in the United States

== Management ==
From 1963, Gudmund Vigtel led the High as director for 28 years, overseeing its transformation from a regional institution housed in a simple brick building into one of the nation's most successful art museums, and shepherding its move to its building designed by Richard Meier. The Meier building, now the Stent Family Wing, was termed Director Gudmund Vigtel's "crowning achievement" by Michael Shapiro, a later director. During Vigtel's tenure from 1963 to 1991, the size of the museum's permanent collection tripled, endowment and trust funds of more than $15 million were established, the operating budget increased from $60,000 to $9 million and the staff expanded from four to 150. Ned Rifkin served as the museum's director between 1991 and 2000. During the tenure of director Michael E. Shapiro between 2000 and 2014, the museum nearly doubled the number of works in its permanent collection, acquiring important paintings by 19th and 20th century and contemporary artists. The High raised nearly $230 million during that time, increasing its endowment by nearly 30 percent and building an acquisition fund of nearly $20 million. In July 2015, the High Museum of Art announced that it had selected Randall Suffolk to be its new director. Suffolk began his tenure in November 2015. Under Suffolk's leadership, the High’s audience diversity increased: nonwhite visitorship more than tripled from 2015 to 2020, and about 60 percent of the High's audience as of 2022 is under the age of 35, not counting school groups.

== Appearances in film and television ==
The High has been featured as a location in several popular films and television shows, including The Resident (as Chastain Park Memorial Hospital), What to Expect When You're Expecting, The Falcon and the Winter Soldier (as the Smithsonian National Air and Space Museum), Manhunter (as Lecktor's prison), Black Panther (as the Museum of Great Britain), Red Band Society, and The Divergent Series films Insurgent and Allegiant (as the former Erudite Headquarters).

== See also ==
- List of largest art museums
- List of museums in Atlanta
