= Fergie Chambers =

American heir and political activist

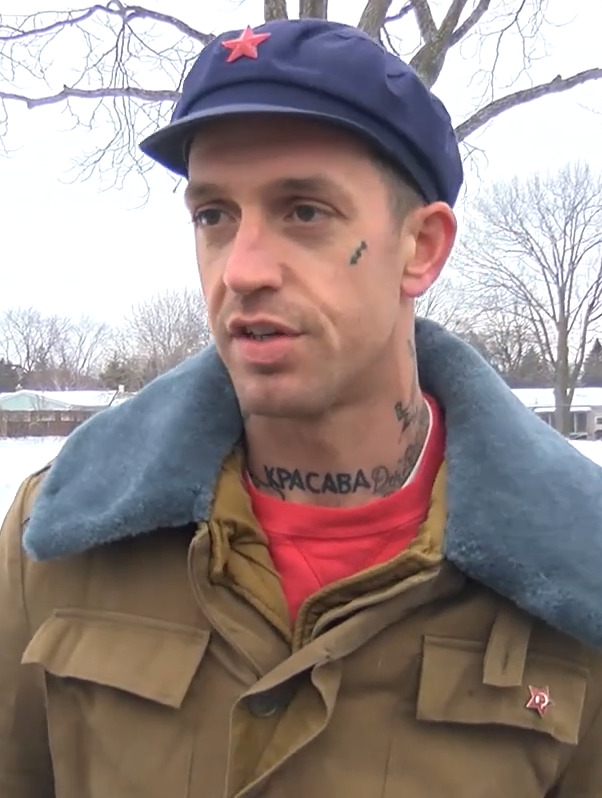
- Chambers in 2023
- Born: James Cox Chambers Jr. 1985 (age 40–41)
- Other name: Fergie
- Occupation: Political activist
- Organization: Berkshire Communists
- Spouses: Anya Vostrova (divorced) Cameron Park (divorced) Stella Schnabel (m. 2024)
- Children: 4
- Father: James Cox Chambers
- Family: Anne Cox Chambers (Paternal Grandmother); Margaret Hamilton (Maternal Grandmother); James M. Cox (Great-Grandfather)

James Cox "Fergie" Chambers Jr. (born c. 1985) is an American communist political activist and member of the Cox family, which derives its wealth from Cox Enterprises. Chambers owned a portion of Cox Enterprises until separating from the company in 2023, resulting in a payout estimated by Rolling Stone of at least $250 million.

Chambers is a supporter of the pro-Palestine movement, and has donated over $1 million to humanitarian causes in Gaza and has also paid legal fees for members of pro-Palestine activist groups. He has expressed support for Hamas and has supported Russia's invasion of Ukraine.

In July 2026, Chambers was arrested in Ibiza, Spain, on a United States extradition request. The request lists charges of riot, conspiracy to commit riot and international money laundering; US authorities allege that about $7.5 million he transferred to Tunisia was intended to support Hamas, although he has not been charged with terrorism offenses. Chambers denies wrongdoing; his family, his lawyers and left-wing politicians in Spain and Ireland have described the case as politically motivated. On 22 September, the Spanish government agreed to allow the extradition process against Chambers to proceed; he applied for asylum in Spain. On November 20, 2026, a Spanish high court granted conditional bail to Chambers.

Chambers is the central subject of All About the Money, a 2026 documentary film. He has lived in Tunisia and Ireland and is married to Stella Schnabel.

== Early life ==
Chambers is the son of James Cox Chambers, a businessman in the renewable energy sector, and Lauren Hamilton; the Cox family controls Cox Enterprises. He is the great-grandson of James M. Cox, a Governor of Ohio and the Democratic Party's presidential nominee in 1920. Chambers has said that his maternal grandmother, Margaret Hamilton, a former NASA software engineer, is the only relative with whom he remained in contact. He spent his childhood in Brooklyn, New York, primarily with his mother, as his parents divorced when he was two years old.

Around age 12, Chambers was introduced to Marxist literature by a teacher, including Howard Zinn's A People's History of the United States, something which made a lasting impression, although by his account, his focus on political activism has ebbed and flowed throughout his life.

Chambers began suffering from severe mental health issues as a child, in part, he says, because of "intense" levels of "focus and attention and pathologization" from his family. Chambers recalls turning toward drugs and being depressed and suicidal as an adolescent, spending nearly three years in hospitals and rehabs, which radicalized him, as he "ended up [...] coming up against the discipline of the ruling class in that way. A history of childhood sexual abuse is also referenced in All About the Money; according to a review of the film in Variety, this history "emerges in fits and starts" over the course of the documentary.

He attended Saint Ann's School and enrolled at Bard College, where he met his first wife, Anya Vostrova; he did not complete a degree. The Irish Times reported that he was expelled from Bard after cooking crack cocaine in his dormitory room, and that his relationship with Vostrova later led him to a period of sobriety and a conversion to Catholicism.

== Career and activism ==
Chambers has described himself as a communist and has provided funding for leftist causes, including through paying legal fees for others. Chambers began funding left-wing causes in the early 2000s and later founded the Babochki Collective, a grantmaking initiative. Members of the Babochki Collective (Babochki is Russian for "Butterflies") served as his ideological advisers, including Calla Walsh and Paige Belanger of the direct-action network Unity of Fields.

In his 20s, Chambers moved to Smyrna, Georgia, to work as a management trainer at the Cox Enterprises-owned Manheim, but returned to Bard for further study before moving with his wife Anya Vostrova to Russia after the 2008 financial crisis. He returned in 2012, where he operated two gyms in the Atlanta area, including a CrossFit gym in Alpharetta, Georgia. In 2012, an employee of Chambers' was Marjorie Taylor Greene. In 2020, Chambers claimed to have witnessed Greene conduct multiple extramarital affairs while employed by him.

In 2011, Chambers donated to the Occupy Wall Street movement, and in 2014, his public activism grew during protests and organizing efforts following the shooting of Michael Brown in Ferguson, Missouri.

In Georgia, Chambers has provided financial support for members of the Stop Cop City movement, including paying bail and lawyers' fees for people arrested in connection with the protests of the construction of the Atlanta Public Safety Training Center. After learning in 2023 that Cox Enterprises had invested $10 million in the construction of the Atlanta Public Safety Training Center, he chose to divest from the company. Around this time, Chambers described his relatives as "enemies of the people" and the "Cox Klux Klan".

=== Dakota Access Pipeline protests and Madison, Georgia commune ===
In 2016, Chambers participated in the Dakota Access Pipeline protests. Following the end of the Standing Rock protest camp, he bought property in Madison, Georgia, outside of Atlanta, and moved there with his then-wife, Cameron Park, and another couple. He soon expanded the commune, which hosted more than a dozen people at its height; many were Standing Rock protestors. Chambers provided a stipend of $2,000 a month for members, in exchange for working on the property and participating in political study groups.

Three former commune members recall in 2024 interviews with Rolling Stone that little happened on the commune aside from rampant psychedelic usage, with one describing Chambers as "seeking a shamanistic path of healing and trying to prescribe that to other people as well". Chambers lived in a house on the property with his then-wife and another woman, who said that she had been attracted to the property because Chambers "wanted us to be able to live not having to be slaves of capitalism".

Rachael and another resident, Amanda Lee, told the reporter that Chambers and his wife were committed to polyamory. Lee said that Chambers "wanted to do this whole swinger place. He wanted to have free love. It was totally sex-oriented". The Georgia commune was closed in early 2019 and the property sold by Chambers in 2020.

=== Berkshire Communists and Alford, Massachusetts commune ===
Chambers moved to New England after selling his Georgia property. In Massachusetts, he founded a group called the Berkshire Communists, which identifies itself as a "revolutionary Marxist–Leninist collective". As a project of the Berkshire Communists, he bought at least 65 acres in Alford, Massachusetts, where he set up a six-home residential collective, Alford Family Farm, and a multipurpose community center, the Berkshire People's Gym, which was closed to "landlords and capitalists", among others.

Anyone who identified as a communist could live on the property for free, in exchange for property maintenance work and participation in communist theory study groups. Residents included Babochki member Paige Belanger, who met Chambers through the People's Gym programs. Chambers also bought property in New Hampshire and moved there in mid-2023, where he planned to build an MMA gym and invite people to live in residential properties he owned there.

=== Elbit Systems protests ===
In October 2023, Chambers took part in an action at the Cambridge, Massachusetts office of the defense contractor Elbit Systems. He has been described in press reports as a founder of Palestine Action US, an American offshoot of the British group Palestine Action. In a January 2024 interview with NH Journal, Chambers said he considered himself a founding organizer because he took part in its first action in Cambridge, but denied that Palestine Action US was an organization or that he led or financed it, describing it as a network of independent groups whose social media accounts shared news of direct actions.

On November 20, 2023, activists acting under the Palestine Action US banner targeted Elbit's office in Merrimack, New Hampshire. Police said the building was spray-painted, its windows broken and a lobby door locked shut, and arrested three women, including Calla Walsh, on the roof. A fourth woman was arrested in January 2024. Chambers paid $50,000 in cash bail for the three women arrested on the roof. In November 2024, the four women were sentenced to jail terms.

At his November 2026 extradition hearing, Chambers testified that he had joined two protests at Elbit sites in the United States, where he blocked entrances but caused no damage, and that he had paid bail for several people arrested at them. Chambers left the United States soon after the Merrimack action and moved to Tunisia. One arrestee told documentary filmmaker Sinéad O'Shea that Chambers "was involved in the planning, and he was involved in the action", and said that he had left and denied involvement while she and the other defendants were punished. Chambers later paid her legal fees and, following the closure of the Alford commune, provided her with a severance payment.

Following the Elbit protest, in January 2024, the Berkshire People's Gym was shut down when Alford town officials enforced a cease‑and‑desist over zoning violations, finding that the gym had been operating in a barn permitted solely for agricultural storage.

== 2026 arrest and extradition proceedings ==
On 10 July 2026, Chambers was arrested in the street in Ibiza, Spain, by Spanish National Police while with family members, pursuant to a sealed extradition request submitted by the United States Department of Justice. He appeared before Audiencia Nacional judge Antonio Piña on 11 July 2026, who ordered his continued detention without bail pending the outcome of the case, with a further custody review scheduled for 16 July 2026.

According to a statement from the Audiencia Nacional, the United States has a 40-day period to submit formal extradition paperwork; should Chambers not consent to extradition, a hearing will determine the matter, with any decision subject to final approval from the Spanish government's Council of Ministers, led by Prime Minister Pedro Sánchez. Stanley Cohen, an American attorney with four decades of experience in terrorism-related cases, called it politically motivated and described the case as the first known instance of the United States seeking a citizen's extradition over alleged support for Hamas. Trevor Aaronson, an author who has written on the FBI and terrorism prosecutions, compared it to the Holy Land Foundation prosecutions of the mid-2000s, warning of a "chilling effect" on charitable giving to Palestinian causes, and linked the reasoning to arguments previously made by Sebastian Gorka, a Trump administration counterterrorism official, about alleged links between leftist groups and terrorism.

The arrest drew criticism from left-wing politicians in Spain and Ireland, including Irene Montero of Podemos, who said the Spanish government should protect Chambers rather than extradite him, and six members of the Sumar parliamentary group, who described it as part of "growing repression" by the Trump administration against the Palestinian solidarity movement. In the Dáil, People Before Profit TD Paul Murphy called it evidence of the "long reach" of United States foreign policy, while Taoiseach Micheál Martin said he was unfamiliar with the specifics but expected Spain to adopt a "fair and honourable" approach.

The US government's request is sealed but according to reports, Chambers is said to be facing several federal charges carrying up to 30 years' imprisonment, the most serious relating to alleged funding of Hamas, though his family has disputed that charge as stemming solely from $7.5 million of his own funds he had transferred from the United States to Tunisia, where he was living at the time. His family has characterized the charges against him as "political persecution" stemming from his charitable support for humanitarian projects in Gaza amid the ongoing genocide there. Neither Spanish authorities nor the U.S. Department of Justice had disclosed the specific charges, and the indictment remains sealed; Chambers has said he had known for more than a decade that he was on the radar of the US federal government.

On 18 September, around 150 prominent artists, activists and academics joined a letter calling on the Spanish government to reject the extradition of Chambers including: Richard Gere, Cynthia Nixon, Natasha Lyonne, Viggo Mortensen, Angela Davis, Greta Thunberg, and Judith Butler. However, on 22 September the Spanish government decided to allow the extradition request. Spanish Minister of Inclusion, Social Security and Migration, Elma Saiz, called the move "purely procedural". According to Chambers's lawyer, the activist is seeking asylum in Spain, which would make his extradition impossible until the process is concluded.

On 13 November 2026, Chambers testified for the first time since his arrest in a two-hour hearing held by Spain's Audiencia Nacional on the US extradition request. During the hearing, he testified that most of the money he had transferred to Tunisia went to sponsor the football club Club Africain.

On November 20, 2026, a Spanish high court granted conditional bail to Chambers. Al-Jazeera reported that "US authorities [have] acknowledged what they described as substantial and unintentional errors in the Spanish translation of an FBI agent’s sworn statement, submitted in support of the extradition request."

== All About the Money (2026 film) ==
Chambers is the central subject of All About the Money, a 2026 documentary directed by Irish filmmaker Sinéad O'Shea. O'Shea learned of Chambers through a friend who had briefly lived at his Massachusetts commune during the COVID-19 pandemic; she wrote to him requesting to film him, and he agreed to participate without setting any conditions beyond a standard release. She began developing the project with Screen Ireland in late 2022 and filmed intermittently from June 2023 to November 2025. O'Shea described Chambers as more forthcoming than most people of his background, saying he "doesn't try to hide in discretion".

The film traces Chambers from the founding of his Massachusetts commune through the November 2023 protest at the Elbit Systems office in Merrimack, New Hampshire and his subsequent relocation to Tunisia, where he became a sponsor of the football club Club Africain and studied Islam. According to O'Shea, Chambers was displeased with the completed film, feeling it did not sufficiently convey his political views or address his 2022 activities in the Donbas region in enough depth, and its closing segment notes that he attempted to pay O'Shea not to release it after viewing a cut. Reviewing the film for Variety, Guy Lodge wrote that it examines how inherited privilege can undermine an avowedly anti-capitalist project, characterising Chambers as an eccentric figure whom the documentary probes without ever fully explaining.

== Views ==
In 2020, Chambers described his political ideology as "somewhere between an eco-anarchist and a Marxist–Leninist", while in 2024 he simply stated his ideology was a Marxist–Leninist and praised Stalin and Mao. Chambers has images of both Stalin and Mao tattooed on his body. He has referred to himself as a "tankie". In All About the Money, Chambers said he is dissatisfied with the convention of political civility in American public life, characterizing himself as opposed to it.

In 2024, Chambers told Mother Jones in an interview that he believes "the most important thing for the prosperity of humanity is the destruction of the US", Los Angeles magazine quoted him as saying, "I chant death to America every day. Imperialism is the death of humanity". He denies that he does so, but agrees with that assessment of imperialism. On 4 July 2026, the 250th anniversary of American independence, he posted a picture of a burning American flag to his Instagram account, with a caption describing 250 years of "unmitigated horror" and calling for the "death" to the United States while criticising those marking the occasion.

Chambers believes that the U.S. has "us[ed] Ukraine as a proxy for" its imperialist ambitions. He has also been supportive of Russia's invasion of Ukraine and visited Russian-occupied Donbas, referring to Vladimir Putin as a "great man". Chambers also stated while in the Donbas region in 2022 that "the only thing anyone’s angry at Putin about there is that he didn’t intervene sooner".

Chambers is a vocal supporter of Hamas; he described the 2023 Hamas-led attack on Israel as "a moment of hope and inspiration for tens of millions of people". Chambers later wrote on X that "No faction of the Palestinian resistance, Hamas or other, has done *anything* wrong". He has also reported that he is a founder of Vox Ummah, an Egyptian-based media outlet aligned with Iranian state media channel Press TV, the United National Antiwar Coalition and the Workers World Party, according to the Network Contagion Research Institute.

== Personal life ==
Chambers first married a Russian woman, Anya Vostrova, whom he met at Bard. They lived in Russia for some time after 2008, and have three children together. Chambers and his second wife, Cameron Park, met in Atlanta after his return from Russia. In 2013, Chambers was arrested for domestic battery and false imprisonment of Park, although he was not prosecuted. They divorced after 2020.

In February 2024, he married Stella Schnabel, daughter of filmmaker Julian Schnabel. They have a son together. Chambers and Schnabel had attended Saint Ann's School in Brooklyn together and reconnected in New York decades later, when Chambers was with Park and spotted Schnabel across the room at a cafe. In January 2026, it was reported that Chambers and Schnabel were filing for divorce. However, in September 2026, CNN stated the pair were still together and were expecting another child.

Chambers has changed religions several times during his life. Born into a White Anglo-Saxon Protestant (WASP) family, Chambers stated that, at times in his life, he tried to commit to being a conservative Protestant. In his early twenties, Chambers converted to Catholicism and embraced hardline anti-abortion views. In the late 2010s, Chambers attended the Peyote Way Church of God, a Native American Church in Arizona. In 2023, Chambers converted to Islam, which, he says, helped him manage his "discomfort in Western society and the world in general" and to lessen his reliance on "sex, drugs, and violence".

He lived in Tunis, Tunisia, until 2025, and was a sponsor of the football club Club Africain. While in Tunisia, Chambers separated from Schnabel for a period and, in 2025, according to the Irish Times, "married" a Tunisian volleyball player before reconciling with Schnabel and relocating together to Dublin.

Chambers previously lived in New Hampshire and the Berkshires region of Massachusetts. His wealth is self-reported to be in the hundreds of millions of dollars.

From 2025 until his 2026 arrest, Chambers had been living in South Dublin, Ireland, in a home reportedly worth €7 million.
