= Barbara Cox Anthony =

American business proprietor

Barbara Cox
- Born: Barbara Blair Cox; December 4, 1922; U.S.
- Died: May 28, 2007 (aged 84)
- Spouses: Bradford Ripley (widowed); Stanley C. Kennedy, Jr. (divorced); James W. Glover (widowed); Garner Anthony, Jr.
- Children: James C. Kennedy; Blair Parry-Okeden
- Parents: James M. Cox; Margaretta Blair
- Relatives: Anne Cox Chambers (sister); Katharine Rayner (niece); Margaretta Taylor (niece); James Cox Chambers (nephew); James Worth Thornton (second cousin)

Barbara Blair Cox Anthony (December 8, 1922 – May 28, 2007) was the youngest daughter of James M. Cox, a Democratic governor of Ohio, newspaper publisher and broadcaster. With her sister Anne Cox Chambers and her brother James M. Cox Jr., she inherited, via a trust, ownership and control of her father's company, now called Cox Enterprises. Upon her brother's death in 1974, the sisters received his share of the company equally.

Her net worth was estimated at $12 billion, based principally on her equity interest in Cox Enterprises, which made her one of the richest women in the United States and the richest resident of Hawaii.

She served as a Director of Cox Enterprises, one of the largest diversified media companies in the United States. It owns one of the nation's largest cable television businesses, which provides internet and telephone, publishes newspapers including the Atlanta Journal-Constitution and The Palm Beach Post, owns and operates broadcast television and radio stations and owns Manheim, an automobile auction firm. It also owns stakes in a variety of internet businesses, including AutoTrader.com, the largest retail automotive shopping site in the world. Her son James C. Kennedy is chairman of Cox Enterprises.

Well known in Hawaii for her support of philanthropic causes, Anthony helped found La Pietra: Hawaii School for Girls and served as its chair from 1978 until her death in Honolulu in 2007, aged 85, following an extended illness. She also made contributions to the Veterinary School of Colorado State University, endowing two chairs in equine health.

== Personal life ==
Anthony was married four times. She did not have children with her first husband, Bradford Ripley, a naval aviator who died in World War II. She had two children with her second husband, airline executive Stanley C. Kennedy, Jr.: James C. Kennedy, chairman of Cox Enterprises, and Blair Parry-Okeden, Australia's richest woman. They later divorced. Her third husband was James W. Glover, a successful contractor; he died a few years after their marriage. Her fourth husband was Garner Anthony, Jr., who preceded his stepson James Kennedy as chairman of Cox Enterprises, serving in that position from 1974 to 1987. As Mrs. Bradford Williams Ripley II, she was the ship's sponsor for the aircraft carrier USS Midway (CVB 41) and christened the ship at its launch at Newport News Shipbuilding, Virginia, on March 20, 1945.

== See also ==
- List of billionaires
- Forbes 400
