= Blair Parry-Okeden =

American-Australian billionaire

- Born: 1950 (age 75–76); Honolulu, Hawaii, U.S.
- Education: La Pietra: Hawaii School for Girls
- Known for: Heiress, Cox Enterprises
- Spouse: Simon Parry-Okeden (divorced)
- Children: 2
- Parents: Stanley C. Kennedy, Jr; Barbara Cox Anthony
- Relatives: James M. Cox (grandfather); James C. Kennedy (brother); Anne Cox Chambers (aunt); Katharine Rayner (first cousin); Margaretta Taylor (first cousin); James Cox Chambers (first cousin)

Blair Parry-Okeden (born 1950) is an American-born Australian billionaire heiress and philanthropist. According to Forbes Asia, she was Australia's richest person by net worth in 2016. Parry-Okeden's wealth derives from Cox Enterprises.

== Early life ==
Parry-Okeden was born in 1950 in Honolulu, Hawaii, and educated there at La Pietra: Hawaii School for Girls, which was founded by her mother, Barbara Cox Anthony. She then studied to become a teacher.

Parry-Okeden's grandfather James M. Cox founded the privately held media company Cox Enterprises. Her brother James C. Kennedy is the chairman, and her aunt, Anne Cox Chambers, is the largest shareholder and sits on the board. In 2007, following the death of her mother, Parry-Okeden inherited 25% of Cox Enterprises. She currently has no role at the company.

== Wealth ==
Parry-Okeden first came to prominence in Australia in March 2009 when Forbes Asia assessed her net worth at A$7.0 billion. In January 2016, her net worth was assessed by Forbes at US$9.8 billion; and in 2019 her wealth was estimated at US$9.3 billion; however, she no longer appeared on the list of Australians by net worth due to her US citizenship. She has given money to the Shore School, the University of Hawaii's Center on Aging, the Scone Grammar School, and Strathearn Village, a non-profit aged-care centre.

== Personal life ==
Parry-Okeden has two sons, Andrew and Henry, with her ex-husband Simon Parry-Okeden. She lives in Australia, having moved there from the US in the 1970s to live with her husband at the time.

== Published works ==
- Parry-Okeden, Blair; Maree, Noella, (illustrator.) (1989). Down by the gate. Hillarys, W.A.: Bello Books. ISBN 978-0-9588904-2-7.^{[note a]}

== Notes ==
- ^[note a] Down by the gate is a children's book about an advertisement that Mother Goose placed in a newspaper.
