= James M. Cox Jr. =

American businessman

James McMahon Cox Jr. (June 27, 1903 – October 27, 1974), was an American businessman who became the chairman of Cox Enterprises and Cox Broadcasting Corporation after his father James M. Cox died in 1957. His charitable foundation supported causes including the Cox International Center (James M. Cox Jr. Center for International Mass Communication Training and Research) at the University of Georgia which promotes training and research for journalists internationally. Born in Dayton, Ohio, Cox graduated from Yale University in 1928 and joined the Dayton Daily News as a reporter, later becoming general manager and assistant publisher of the paper.

After his father died in 1957 he took over leadership of the Cox business and initiated a series of acquisitions beginning with three small cable systems in rural Pennsylvania in 1962, setting course for the company to become a "cable-TV empire". In 1968 he bought Manheim Auctions, a wholesale used car auction business. When he died in 1974 at age 71, leadership of the company transferred to his two sisters: Barbara Cox Anthony and Anne Cox Chambers.
