= James C. Kennedy =

American media executive

- Born: November 29, 1947 (age 78); Honolulu, Territory of Hawaii
- Education: B.A. University of Denver
- Occupation: Businessperson
- Known for: Chair of Cox Enterprises
- Spouse: Sarah Kennedy
- Parent(s): Stanley C. Kennedy Jr. Barbara Cox Anthony
- Relatives: James M. Cox (grandfather); Stanley Kennedy Sr. (grandfather); Blair Parry-Okeden (sister); Anne Cox Chambers (aunt); Katharine Rayner (first cousin); Margaretta Taylor (first cousin); James Cox Chambers (first cousin)

James Cox Kennedy (born November 29, 1947) is an American media executive and the current chair of Cox Enterprises, the conglomerate founded by his grandfather, James M. Cox. According to the 2017 Forbes billionaires list, he is the 105th-richest person in the world, the 37th-richest person in the United States, and the richest person in the state of Georgia.

== Personal life and education ==
Born on November 29, 1947, in Honolulu, in the Territory of Hawaii, Kennedy is the son of Barbara Cox Anthony and airline executive Stanley C. Kennedy Jr. His maternal grandfather was James M. Cox, the 46th and 48th governor of Ohio, newspaper publisher and broadcaster. In 2007, Kennedy inherited a 25% stake in Cox Enterprises after his mother died. Kennedy now serves as chairman of Cox Enterprises. His sister is Blair Parry-Okeden, Australia's second-richest woman.

Kennedy received his bachelor's degree in business administration from the University of Denver in 1970. In 2003, he received an honorary doctorate of humane letters from Kennesaw State University, located in Kennesaw, Georgia. In 2018, he was granted an honorary doctorate from Colorado State University.

Kennedy lives in Atlanta with his wife, Sarah. They have three grown children—a daughter and two sons—and three grandchildren.

== Career ==
Kennedy began his career with Cox Enterprises in 1972, working in a variety of media roles. He began his career with Cox Newspapers where he held several positions in the newspaper industry, including production assistant, reporter, copy editor, advertising salesman, business manager, and executive vice president/general manager in Atlanta. He was named president of Grand Junction Newspapers, Inc. in 1979 and was quickly named publisher of the Grand Junction Daily Sentinel, where he worked the back shop as well as on the newsroom floor. He was known as the "New Kid." Soon after, Kennedy returned to Atlanta where in 1986, he was named executive vice president of Cox Enterprises. He was inducted into the Technology Association of Georgia's Technology Hall of Fame in 2016.

A 2015 Forbes magazine profile on Kennedy was titled "This Billionaire Knows The Secret To Saving A Family Business".

== Educational and community outreach ==
Recognized for his contributions to the community, Kennedy and his wife, Sarah, were awarded the Philanthropists of the Year by the Greater Atlanta Chapter of the Association for Fund-raising Professionals in 2003. In 2004, he was inducted into Georgia State University's J. Mack Robinson College of Business Hall of Fame. He established the Jim Kennedy Scholarship Fund to support children of Cox employees. The Fund annually awards ten scholarships valued at up to $40,000 each.

Kennedy has also remained closely connected to his alma mater, the University of Denver. He has contributed to the university by serving as a member of its board of trustees. In 2008, Kennedy gave the university a ten-million-dollar gift to create the James C. Kennedy Institute for Educational Success in the Morgridge College of Education. The purpose of this institute is to identify innovative and cost-effective means for promoting and sustaining the educational success of vulnerable children.

As a nature enthusiast, Kennedy once served as Chairman of the Colorado Division of Wildlife Commission. He currently serves on the board of the PATH Foundation, previously served on the boards of Ducks Unlimited and Atlanta Committee for Progress, and is also a former president of Wetlands America Trust, Inc. In 2008, Kennedy also established the James C. Kennedy Endowed Chair in Waterfowl and Wetlands Conservation in the Department of Wildlife & Fisheries of the College of Forest Resources at Mississippi State University. Kennedy's gift sustains in perpetuity the teaching, research, and outreach program in waterfowl and wetlands ecology and conservation at MSU. In 2013, Tallahatchie General Hospital, with funding from Jim Kennedy, chairman of Cox Enterprises, announced plans to build a Wellness Center in Charleston, Mississippi. The Center opened in 2016 and the Mississippi House of Representatives passed a resolution in support of the facility. In 2014, the U.S. Fish & Wildlife Service announced a land exchange in Mississippi with Kennedy to conserve wildlife habitats and provide outdoor recreation for public access. He also gave $3.3 million to Clemson University to establish and endow the James C. Kennedy Waterfowl and Wetlands Conservation Center, headquartered at the Belle W. Baruch Institute for Coastal Ecology and Forest Science in Georgetown and Nemours Wildlife Foundation in Beaufort. In 2016, he gave $3.1M to create a University Endowed Chair in Wetlands and Waterfowl Conservation at Colorado State University. Wetlands America Trust presented Kennedy with its 2014 National Blue-winged Teal Award for giving his time, talent and treasure for the conservation of natural resources.

He was a featured speaker at Fortune's Brainstorm Green where he spoke on the importance of sustainability. He encouraged sustainability through the company's participation in the American Business Act on Climate Change Pledge.

Kennedy was diagnosed with prostate cancer in 2014. He encouraged Cox employees to participate in Movember to raise awareness for men's health. The company raised nearly $2 million for the Movember Foundation. He is currently cancer free and encourages Cox employees to participate in health screenings for early detection. In 2015, he announced a $25 million grant to Emory University from the James M. Cox Foundation that will support prostate cancer initiatives.

== Right of way controversy ==
Kennedy was involved in a dispute where he tried to take away the rights of the public to access an 8-mile stretch of river that runs through land he owns on the Ruby River in Montana. The Montana Supreme Court ruled against Kennedy.

Business positions
Preceded by Blair Parry-Okeden	Chair of Cox Enterprises ?–present	Succeeded by Incumbent
