= All About the Money (2026 film) =

2026 Irish documentary film

- Theatrical release poster
- Directed by: Sinéad O'Shea
- Written by: Sinéad O'Shea
- Produced by: Sinéad O'Shea; Claire McCabe; Harry Vaughn; Katie Holly; Sigrid Dyekjær
- Cinematography: Enda O'Dowd
- Edited by: Enda O'Dowd
- Music by: George Brennan
- Production companies: SOS Productions; Real Lava
- Distributed by: Breakout Pictures
- Release dates: January 28, 2026 (Sundance); October 30, 2026 (Ireland)
- Running time: 95 minutes
- Country: Ireland
- Language: English

All About the Money is a 2026 Irish documentary film directed, written, and produced by Sinéad O'Shea, with producers Claire McCabe, Harry Vaughn, Katie Holly, and Sigrid Dyekjær. It made its world premiere in the World Cinema Documentary Competition at the 2026 Sundance Film Festival.

== Premise ==
The film follows two years in the life of Fergie Chambers, the great-grandson of James M. Cox, a former Governor of Ohio and 1920 Democratic presidential nominee, and a member of the family behind Cox Enterprises. Chambers founds a communist collective on a property in Alford, Massachusetts, offering free accommodation to residents aligned with his Marxist–Leninist principles, with the stated goal of disrupting the capitalist system.

The film traces his journey from the Massachusetts commune to Tunisia, where he relocates after arrests stemming from a protest action against Israeli defense contractor Elbit Systems and where he finances a soccer club. The documentary also addresses the broader political context of the October 7 attacks, Israel's war on Gaza, and the political comeback of Donald Trump. At the end of the film, a title card reveals that Chambers offered to fully fund the film if O'Shea agreed never to screen it. Another card adds that she turned him down, and he understood.

== Development ==
All About the Money is produced by Claire McCabe, Sinéad O’Shea, Katie Holly, Harry Vaughn, and Sigrid Dyekjær, with support from Screen Ireland, Inevitable Pictures, and Real Lava.

O'Shea first learned about Chambers through a friend who had briefly lived at his Massachusetts project during the COVID-19 pandemic. After researching Chambers and his family background, she wrote to him, and he agreed to be filmed without any terms or conditions, signing only a standard release. O'Shea began developing the film with Screen Ireland in late 2022 and started filming in June 2023. O'Shea and O'Dowd traveled to Tunisia with Chambers, where authorities confiscated three days of footage. She continued shooting through November 2025, with the final interview taking place after the film had already been accepted into the Sundance Film Festival.

An alternative working title for the film was Eye of the Needle, a reference to the biblical parable in which a rich man is told he has no more chance of entering heaven than a camel has of passing through the eye of a needle. O'Shea ultimately felt the title was too obscure.

== Release ==
All About the Money made its world premiere in the World Cinema Documentary Competition at the 2026 Sundance Film Festival. It was available online for public viewing from January 29 to February 1, 2026. Breakout Pictures will release the film in Ireland on October 30.

== Reception ==
On the review aggregator website Rotten Tomatoes, 91% of 11 critics' reviews are positive.

Writing for Variety, Guy Lodge described the film as a "timely, pointed examination of how capitalist privilege can corrupt even an expressly anti-capitalist project" and called Chambers a "compellingly eccentric figure" who is "mercurial" and "unlovably charismatic."

Chambers himself was not enthusiastic about the finished film. According to O'Shea, he felt the documentary did not contain enough political content, particularly regarding his activism in Donbass.
