= Calla Walsh =

American political activist (born 2004)

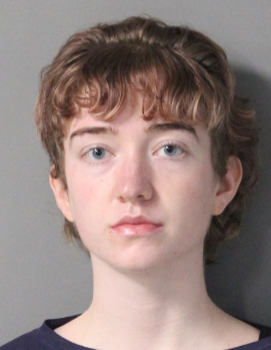
- Walsh in October 2023
- Born: Calla Mairead Walsh; June 9, 2004 (age 22); Cambridge, Massachusetts, United States
- Education: Shady Hill School; The Winsor School
- Occupation: Political activist
- Organizations: Unity of Fields; Peace Action; Democratic Socialists of America (until December 2021)
- Political party: Democratic Party (until circa 2022)

Calla Mairead Walsh (born June 9, 2004) is an American far-left political activist. Previously a member of, and activist in, the Democratic Party and the Democratic Socialists of America, Walsh abandoned electoral politics in 2022 following disagreements with U.S. Senator Ed Markey over policy on Israel and Palestine.

As a teenager, Walsh was a prominent volunteer within Massachusetts Democratic politics, and commentators later credited the loosely organized youth network she helped lead, nicknamed the "Markeyverse," with bolstering Markey's standing among young voters during his 2020 re-election campaign.

Following her break with electoral politics, in 2023 Walsh co-founded the US of wing Palestine Action, later rebranding to Unity of Fields. She participated in direct action campaigns against Israeli defence contractor Elbit Systems for which she faced felony charges in New Hampshire, ultimately pleading guilty to misdemeanor criminal mischief and trespass and serving a 60-day jail sentence in 2024. According to The Free Press and The Boston Globe, Walsh has lived in Beirut, Lebanon, since September 2025. Since 2025 and through the 2026 Iran war, Walsh has spoken in support of Iran and the Axis of Resistance. She has made various trips to Iran, giving speeches on Iranian-state television and attending the funeral of Ali Khamenei in July 2026, and called for violence against Israeli and American officials.

== Early life and education ==
Calla Mairead Walsh was born on June 9, 2004, and was raised in Cambridge, Massachusetts. Her father, Chris Walsh, is an English professor and serves as director of Boston University's college writing program. Chris Walsh previously served as a Peace Corps volunteer and Fulbright fellow in Africa, and in the 1990s worked as secretary to the novelist Saul Bellow. Her mother, Mary Walsh, writes young adult fiction and teaches at Harvard Extension School. Walsh is the second-oldest of four siblings, and grew up with her younger brothers and sisters in a family home not far from Harvard Square. Walsh has described her family's socioeconomic background as "petty bourgeois".

Walsh began her political activism in Cambridge, at the age of 14 or 15. In 2018, she organized to support a Massachusetts bill that would have banned gender identity-based discrimination in public places. The following year, she helped organize the Boston Youth Climate Strike.

Walsh attended Shady Hill School, Cambridge Rindge and Latin School, and the private, all-girls college preparatory day school Winsor School. She then enrolled as an undergraduate at McGill University in Montreal, Canada, later dropping out.

== Democratic Party activism ==
In 2020, Walsh volunteered for Elizabeth Warren's 2020 presidential campaign, before working for progressive Jordan Meehan's state representative primary challenge against Kevin Honan in Allston–Brighton and U.S. Senator Ed Markey's re‑election campaign that same year. According to The New York Times, Walsh helped drive the youth vote and manage digital outreach. Within this network, informally known as the "Markeyverse," unpaid supporters such as Walsh were given titles like "campaign fellow," and some introduced Markey during campaign video calls, while a constellation of fan-style social media accounts helped popularize him among young, internet-savvy voters. Campaign associates later said Walsh was an unusually driven presence within this network, and that she seemed to court media attention more than many of her peers. In August 2020, the campaign of Joseph P. Kennedy III, Markey's challenger in the Democratic primary, referred to Walsh directly as a contributor to a toxic online atmosphere surrounding Kennedy's primary challenge against Markey. The New York Times noted that Walsh was personally responsible for digging through old Twitter posts to find material to attack Democratic candidates she found insufficiently left-wing. Walsh later said the episode left her feeling that she wielded genuine influence over the race, an impression that reinforced her combative approach to online organizing afterward.

From late 2020 to September 2021, Walsh served as regional organizer and strategist for Act on Mass, a watchdog and advocacy group. She spent time volunteering for Mayor of Boston Michelle Wu's 2021 campaign, then briefly served as digital director for Boston City Council member Julia Mejia.

In August 2021, Walsh was elected the youngest delegate at the Democratic Socialists of America (DSA) national convention. That same month, Walsh wrote an article for Teen Vogue in which she advocated for the mobilization of Gen Z within the DSA to build a socialist future, inspired by figures such as Bernie Sanders and Angela Davis, whose activism she claimed shaped her political outlook. Walsh argued that capitalism was the root cause of economic injustice and ecological collapse.

By December 2021, Walsh had quit the DSA over their support for Jamaal Bowman, whom Walsh denounced as a "Zionist". That same month, Walsh wrote an article in Mondoweiss that criticized Markey's response to the Sheikh Jarrah controversy, highlighting his framing of the Israeli–Palestinian conflict as a "both-sides" issue rather than as a settlers vs. natives issue. Walsh argued that the youth-driven "stan politics" supporting Markey during his 2020 campaign hindered accountability and limited pressure for policy changes. She argued that Markey "owed" her for her support and pressured him to take a harder stance on Israel. In response, Markey issued a sterner statement on Israel. Walsh was dissatisfied with it, and declared she was giving up on electoral politics.

Circa late 2022, Walsh was co-chair of the National Network on Cuba, which she described as "a coalition of organizations across the United States described as fighting to end the U.S. war on Cuba".

She also joined the board of Massachusetts Peace Action and served as office manager and social media contributor in the group's campaigns, particularly its international solidarity efforts.

== Allegations against Patrick Horan ==
In December 2022, Walsh alleged in a lengthy, since-deleted post on Twitter that she had been in an exploitative relationship with Patrick Horan, a 27-year-old activist she met while working on a 2020 Massachusetts state representative campaign. Horan, who was active in the Democratic Socialists of America and later worked for Act on Mass and the Boston Planning and Development Agency, reportedly began paying Walsh romantic attention after the two first met in person in July 2020, shortly after her sixteenth birthday; the age of consent in Massachusetts is 16. Walsh said their interactions grew more personal into that fall and eventually included physical contact, though she said the relationship never involved sexual intercourse, and that Horan was aware at the time that she was struggling with her mental health and an eating disorder. Walsh said she ended the relationship in October 2021 after returning to in-person schooling, and that Horan continued to contact her afterward.

Horan left his position at the Boston Planning and Development Agency within a month of Walsh's allegation, receiving one month of severance pay; he did not publicly respond to her claims. Some of Walsh's former political associates said the allegation prompted reflection on how the situation had gone unnoticed at the time.

== Direct action activism ==
In the summer before her senior year at Winsor, Walsh began reading the writings of Assata Shakur, a militant convicted in 1979 of killing a New Jersey state trooper who later escaped from prison and fled to Cuba; Walsh later described the experience as part of her political radicalization.

In 2022 and 2023, Walsh traveled to Cuba as part of solidarity brigades, praising the island's "people's democracy" in essays and public writings authored afterwards. In 2022, Walsh appeared on Chinese state media to criticize Nancy Pelosi's visit to Taiwan. In July 2023, Walsh was arrested after staging a sit-in at the Washington office of Senator Bob Menendez of New Jersey, who was a critic of the Cuban government.

In 2022, Walsh promoted the "Boston Mapping Project" on Twitter, a website tracking Boston-area institutions that it accused of involvement in "colonization of Palestine" and related harms like policing and US imperialism. The anonymous organizers said their aim was to "dismantle" and "disrupt" these targets. The list included police stations, media outlets, universities and schools, defense firms, and several Jewish nonprofits, such as the Synagogue Council of Massachusetts and Combined Jewish Philanthropies. Local Jewish organizers in Boston stated that while no attacks were linked to the project, the organization was "continuing to be bad actors and promoting violent action". In April 2024, Walsh stated she was "not part of the Mapping Project" but reaffirmed her support, describing it as a "research map of Zionist/imperialist institutions", not a "Jew hit list".

Following the October 7 attacks, and subsequent Gaza war and genocide, Walsh co-founded the US wing of Palestine Action, later rebranded as Unity of Fields. While working with Unity of Fields, she became acquainted with Marxist-Leninist-Maoist activist Fergie Chambers, heir to the Cox family of Cox Communications, and Rolling Stone described Walsh as a member of Chambers' "Babochki Collective". Chambers has said the two first met in 2022 at a conference on Cuba, and has described his family background as comparable to Walsh's, noting that his grandmother worked as a scientist at the Massachusetts Institute of Technology.

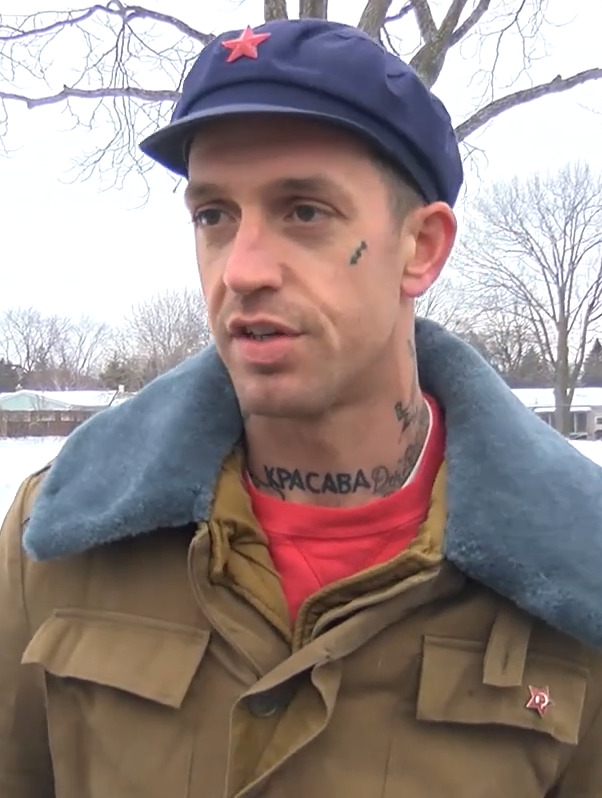
Fergie Chambers, who paid Walsh's bail following her arrest

In the weeks following October 7, Walsh and Chambers held an earlier demonstration at Elbit's Cambridge office in which they bike-locked themselves by the neck to the building's door. On October 30, 2023, Calla Walsh was arrested alongside activist Sophie Ross and seven others during a protest at Elbit Systems' Cambridge, Massachusetts "innovation center". The demonstration, part of a broader campaign by Palestine Action US, involved the use of smoke bombs and graffiti targeting the Israeli-owned defense firm. Related to the Cambridge actions, Walsh received three felony vandalism charges and one disorderly conduct charge, later dismissed in July 2025.

On November 20, 2023, Walsh and others escalated the campaign by occupying the roof of Elbit's Merrimack, New Hampshire facility. During the action, protesters allegedly broke windows, spray-painted slogans including "Free Gaza", and lit smoke flares. Law enforcement in Merrimack, responding to the damage and presence of incendiary devices, involved the FBI in the investigation. They were held in preventative detention for three days, then granted $20,000 cash bail on the condition of no contact with each other and stay-away orders from Elbit. Chambers paid Walsh and her fellow detainees' bail; the Boston Globe reported that he withdrew a total of $30,000 in cash from nine different banks to help cover it. Officials cited Walsh's connections to Chambers, who had at that point fled to Tunisia, as one reason for federal involvement. Investigators also seized Walsh's phone pending a search warrant, prompting constitutional concerns from her legal team. At her initial arraignment, the combined charges she and her co-defendants faced carried a maximum statutory sentence of 37 years in prison, and sympathetic press outlets subsequently referred to the group as the "Merrimack Four". Walsh later said the goal of the Merrimack action had been to inflict substantial financial damage on Elbit and to unsettle its employees.

On February 23, 2024, New Hampshire Attorney General John Formella announced that a grand jury had indicted Walsh, Ross, and fellow activist Bridget Shergalis on felony charges including riot, conspiracy to commit criminal mischief, burglary, and conspiracy to commit falsifying physical evidence. Each charge carried a potential sentence of three and a half to seven years in prison. However, the case did not go to trial. The activists ultimately pleaded guilty to misdemeanor criminal mischief and misdemeanor criminal trespass, and received 60-day jail sentences in Valley Street Jail in Manchester, New Hampshire, with two-year suspended sentences for three years. Walsh and Paige Belanger, another member of Palestine Action US, described the plea deal as a "huge victory", especially in light of the original charges. Before reporting to jail, Walsh and one of her co-defendants got matching tattoos of New Hampshire's state motto, "Live Free or Die"; at their sentencing hearing, Walsh shouted "Free Palestine" in the courtroom. Walsh later said she intended to continue similar direct action in the future but would take greater care to avoid arrest, and she has acknowledged that her activism has likely foreclosed conventional career prospects for her.

In July 2025, Walsh appeared at the 4-day "Condemnation of Terrorism Against Media" festival in Tehran, Iran, where she declared "Death to America", "Death to Israel", and praised the Axis of Resistance in a public speech. The event was organized by the Iranian-state controlled Islamic Republic of Iran Broadcasting corporation, with Walsh's remarks being featured on the Festival's official Twitter account and Walsh giving a speech on Iranian-state television. During at least one of her trips to Iran, Walsh appeared in videos filmed at a facility operated by the Islamic Revolutionary Guard Corps, standing in front of military equipment.

== Views ==
Walsh's political ideology has shifted over time. In the 2010s, she was a member and activist in the Democratic Party, as well as an environmental activist. In 2021, NPR described her as a "progressive organizer and activist based in Massachusetts". Later in 2021, she identified as a democratic socialist and a member of the Democratic Socialists of America. In 2023, she described herself as a communist and anti-imperialist. In a 2025 interview with the Iranian state broadcaster PressTV, Walsh said her political convictions had always been more radical than what could be expressed through electoral campaigns, and characterized her earlier campaign work as simply the avenues that had been available to her at the time to pursue change.

Following the October 7 attacks, Walsh tweeted that "defending their homeland from illegal occupation and genocide isn't 'ugly Palestinian retaliation'". Later that day, Walsh posted a map of the attack sites with the message, "This is what decolonization looks like". In April, Walsh added, "We will never forget who called Palestinian freedom fighters 'terrorists' after October 7 and then turned around and claimed to support Palestine". On October 12, Walsh tweeted that those living in the US have "an obligation to take direct action against murderous companies like Elbit".

For the 2024 presidential election in the United States, Walsh filled in the name of Yahya Sinwar as a write-in candidate. Walsh praised the assassination of Charlie Kirk, and has expressed support for suspect Tyler Robinson, as well as individuals charged with murder such as Elias Rodriguez and Mohamed Sabry Soliman. In a 2025 interview on Free Palestine TV following the fatal shooting of two Israeli embassy staff members in Washington, D.C., for which Rodriguez was arrested, Walsh suggested that more people should have carried out similar attacks.

In December 2025, Walsh was nominated by the pro-Israel group StopAntisemitism for "Antisemite of the Year".

In February and March 2026, following the 2026 Iran war, Walsh wrote a series of posts on X (Twitter) calling for the use of global violence against Israeli and American officials. After a U.S.-Israeli strike killed Iran's supreme leader Ali Khamenei that February, Walsh posted a tribute expressing hope that a global uprising would avenge his death, closing the post with a religious phrase associated with mourning in Islamic tradition. Following the start of the 2026 Iran massacres, Walsh was one of several media personalities that promoted the Iranian state's claim that the protests had been stoked by the CIA and Mossad. In July 2026, Walsh attended the funeral of Khamenei. While there, Walsh stated that she believed that the funeral was effectively "a resounding referendum on the Iranian masses’ loyalty to the Islamic Revolution."

Following an attack on a synagogue in West Bloomfield Township, Michigan, Walsh asked "Why should zionists feel safe anywhere...?" on X. The attacker, who rammed an explosives-laden vehicle into the building, was killed and no one else was harmed, although about 100 children were reportedly at the synagogue's school that day. She has also publicly called for the execution of Lebanese people who collaborate with Israeli soldiers.
