= Connie Wong (public servant) =

Connie Wong (born 3 April 1977) is an American public servant. She has been Boston Fire Department's deputy commissioner for labor relations, human resources, and legal affairs since 2014. She was the first Asian American in the department and has led work to continue to diversify it. Wong also implemented a summer program recruiting high school students from underrepresented communities and bolstered that language skill certification process.

She graduated from the Winsor School in Boston in 1986.
