= James Cox Chambers =

American billionaire heir (born 1957)

- Born: 1956 or 1957 (age 68–69); Atlanta, Georgia, US
- Education: Bard College
- Occupations: Renewable energy entrepreneur, biodynamic farmer, and filmmaker
- Known for: 16.3% share in Cox Enterprises
- Spouses: Lauren Hamilton (m. 1982, divorced) Nabila Khashoggi (m. 2004)
- Children: 2, including Fergie
- Parent(s): Robert W. Chambers; Anne Cox Chambers
- Relatives: James M. Cox (grandfather); Katharine Rayner (half-sister); Margaretta Taylor (half-sister); Barbara Cox Anthony (aunt); James C. Kennedy (first cousin); Blair Parry-Okeden (first cousin); Margaret Hamilton (former-mother-in-law)

James Cox Chambers (born 1956/57) is an American billionaire heir, renewable energy businessman, and filmmaker. As of May 2022, his net worth was estimated at US$4.7 billion.

== Early life ==
Chambers is the son of Robert (Bobby) W. Chambers and Anne Cox Chambers, the former US Ambassador to Belgium, and the grandson of newspaper publisher, three-time Governor of Ohio, and 1920 Democratic nominee for President James M. Cox. He has two half-sisters from his mother's first marriage, Katharine Ann Johnson and Margaretta Johnson, and two half-brothers from his father's first marriage. He graduated from Bard College in 1982.

== Career ==
Chambers is a renewable energy businessman, biodynamic farmer, and filmmaker. Chambers is a co-owner of the Atlanta Hawks and publisher of The Atlanta Journal-Constitution. He is on the board of directors for the Communities in Schools. Chambers also served as the chair of the Board of Trustees of Bard College from 2015 to 2026.

Chambers appeared in the 1984 film Alphabet City.

== Wealth ==
In 2015, his mother Anne Cox Chambers distributed her 49% share in Cox Enterprises equally among her three children. As of June 2018, his net worth is $6.3 billion.

== Personal life ==
In 1982, Chambers married fellow Bard College alumna and actress Lauren Hamilton, the daughter of computer pioneer Margaret Hamilton and James Cox Hamilton, both of Cambridge, Massachusetts. They have a son, James "Jim" Cox Chambers Jr., also known as Fergie, who describes himself as a communist and a "professional revolutionary".

In 2004, Chambers married Nabila Khashoggi, daughter of billionaire Adnan Khashoggi. They have a son and live in Palisades, New York, US.
