= Kelley Blue Book =

American vehicle valuation company

Kelley Blue Book Co., Inc.
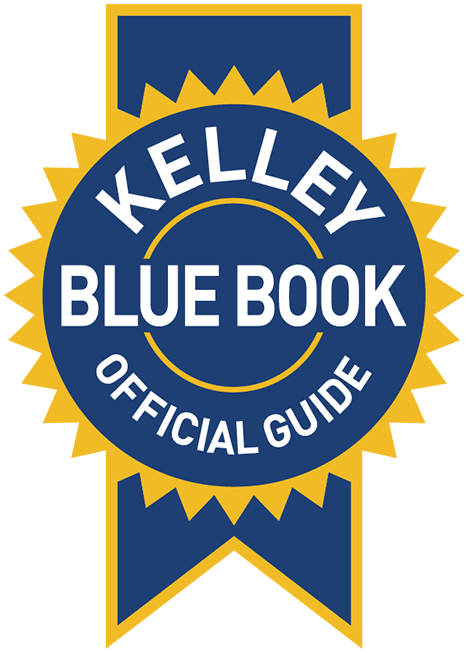
- Type: Subsidiary of Cox Automotive
- Industry: Information services, E-commerce software, Automotive
- Founded: 1918; 108 years ago (as The Kelley Kar Company); 1926; 100 years ago (as Kelley Blue Book)
- Founder: Les Kelley
- Headquarters: Irvine, California, U.S.
- Key people: Les Kelley, Founder; Buster Kelley; Steve Lind, President
- Parent: Cox Automotive
- Website: kbb.com

Kelley Blue Book Co., Inc. (KBB) is an American vehicle valuation and automotive research company. Based in Irvine, California, the company is owned by the Cox Automotive subsidiary of Cox Enterprises.

== History ==
The company began as the Kelley Kar Company founded by Les Kelley in 1918. Kelley started the company with three Model T Fords. His younger brother, Buster, worked with Kelley as a lot boy. By using data collected from the dealership, Kelley published the company's first Blue Book in 1926, which became a standard guide in automotive trade in determining car value. Kelley Blue Book was formed in 1926, and the Kelley family continued its dealership business in Southern California for several decades. By the 1960s, the company moved from a car dealership to a specialty publisher and focused on the production of its automobile price guide. Kelley Blue Book guide became the first publication to use mileage to determine a car's value.

In 1995, Kelley Blue Book created its company website, which contained tips and pricing information from its hardcopy guide.

In December 2010, Kelley Blue Book was purchased by AutoTrader.com. After its acquisition, the company operated as a subsidiary of AutoTrader.com, Inc.

In 2013, the company formed an alliance with Bitauto Holdings Ltd. to expand into China.

== Sponsorship ==
In 2014, Kelley Blue Book signed a two-year agreement with Hendrick Motorsports to be a primary sponsor of Dale Earnhardt Jr.'s No. 88 Chevrolet SS NASCAR Sprint Cup Series team.

== Services ==
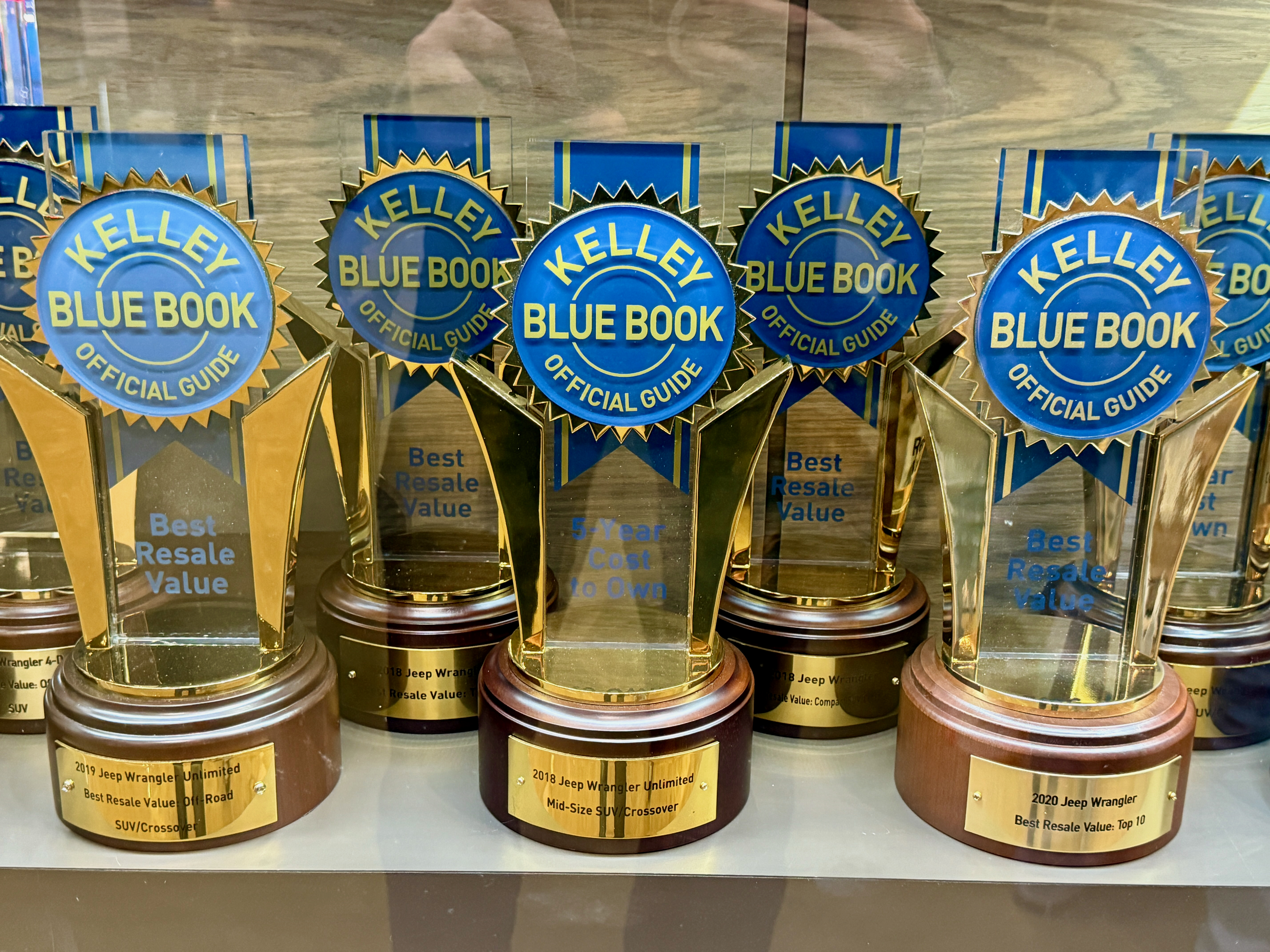
Kelley Blue Book Official Guide. Best Resale Value

The company reports market value prices for new and used automobiles of all types, as well as motorcycles, snowmobiles and personal watercraft. For both new and used automobiles, Kelley Blue Book provides a fair market range and fair purchase price, based on actual transactions of what others are paying for a vehicle and adjusted regularly as market conditions change. For new automobiles, Kelley Blue Book also provides information about a car's MSRP and dealer invoice price. For used cars, Kelley Blue Book provides typical listing price, certified pre-owned price, trade-in value and private party value. Kelley Blue Book also offers expert and consumer vehicle reviews and ratings, and 5-year cost to own information for new cars.

== Recognition ==
In 2012–2014, Harris Poll recognized Kelley Blue Book as the Online Auto Shopping Brand of the Year. In addition, the company received a WebAward in the automotive category of Outstanding Website for two consecutive years.

== See also ==
- TrueCar
