= Martha Field =

American legal scholar (born 1943)

Martha A. Field
- Born: August 20, 1943 (age 83)
- Education: Radcliffe College (BA); University of Chicago (JD)

Martha Amanda Field (born August 20, 1943) is an American legal scholar who serves as the Langdell Professor of Law at Harvard Law School. She is a noted scholar of constitutional law, family law, and bioethics issues such as the rights of the mentally challenged.

== Biography ==
Field is a graduate of the Winsor School. She earned her B.A. from Radcliffe College in Chinese history. She later earned a J.D. from the University of Chicago Law School in 1968, graduating at the top of her class. Field then clerked for Supreme Court Justice Abe Fortas. During her time at the Supreme Court she also clerked for Chief Justice Earl Warren and Chief Justice Warren Burger. Field is one of the most sought after voices in the country for her expertise on issues regarding the Eleventh Amendment to the United States Constitution.

She is among the first women to clerk for the U.S. Supreme Court, to teach at University of Pennsylvania Law School, and to teach at Harvard Law School, respectively. In 2011, The Harvard Crimson stated that Field "has had the longest career at Harvard of all the tenured women currently teaching."

Field was married to Senior U.S. Circuit Judge Michael Boudin of the United States Court of Appeals for the First Circuit, before his death in March 2025.

== See also ==
- List of law clerks for the second seat of the Supreme Court of the United States
