= Hashtag Horror =

#Horror
- Theatrical release poster
- Directed by: Tara Subkoff
- Written by: Tara Subkoff
- Produced by: Tara Subkoff; Oren Segal; Brendan Walsh; Jason Ludman
- Starring: Chloë Sevigny; Timothy Hutton; Natasha Lyonne; Balthazar Getty; Taryn Manning; Stella Schnabel
- Cinematography: Learan Kahanov
- Edited by: Catrin Hedstrom
- Music by: EMA
- Production companies: Gaslight Films; Lowland Pictures
- Distributed by: IFC Midnight
- Release dates: November 12, 2015 (New York Horror Film Festival); November 20, 2015 (U.S.)
- Running time: 97 minutes
- Country: United States
- Language: English

#Horror (pronounced "hashtag horror") is a 2015 American slasher film written and directed by Tara Subkoff, and starring Chloë Sevigny, Timothy Hutton, Natasha Lyonne, Taryn Manning, and Balthazar Getty. The plot follows a group of wealthy seventh-grade girls who face a night of terror together after a social media game spirals out of control, resulting in murder.

The film premiered at the New York City Horror Film Festival on November 12, 2015, and was given a limited theatrical release and through video on demand on November 20, 2015, by IFC Midnight. The film received mixed reviews from critics.

== Plot ==
Harry Cox is having sex in his car with his mistress, Lisa. After Lisa exits the car, his wife Alex calls him and chastises him on the phone. After he hangs up, his throat is slashed, and Lisa is also murdered.

Twelve-year-old Sam is invited to a sleepover at classmate Sofia Cox's mansion in rural Connecticut. Sam finds herself embarrassed by her lack of wealth amongst her rich and privileged classmates. Also at the sleepover are Francesca, Ava, and Georgie. Another girl, Cat White, is being driven to the house by her father, Dr. White; it is established that Cat is suffering from psychological problems and has been in trouble for bullying the girls.

The girls engage in a pretend fashion show, incessantly posting photos of themselves on social media with their smartphones. Cat arrives, and Alex allows the girls into her walk-in safe where numerous pieces of jewelry and clothing are stored. She then leaves to go into town for a twelve-step meeting.

As the night goes on, the girls, each consumed by their cell phones, begin to fight with one another. Cat instigates a confrontation and taunts Georgie about her weight, and Sofia forces her to leave. Cat storms into the woods, where she attempts to call her father to pick her up. She begins tagging Georgie in a stream of cruel photos on Facebook; the girls collectively decide to lock their cell phones in the safe to avoid Cat's cyberbullying, and Sofia throws the keys to the safe in the house's swimming pool.

After Dr. White receives a frantic voicemail from Cat, he returns to the house and interrogates the girls about his daughter's whereabouts, Ava also runs away from the house after Dr. White scares the girls. He tells the girls he is going to press charges. Sam goes to search for Cat in the woods and finds Sofia's father's car parked, with blood across the windshield. She returns to the house panicked, but the girls do not believe her.

Georgie and Francesca begin to taunt Sofia about her mother's alleged affair with Dr. White, and she leaves. In the woods, Sofia also stumbles upon her father's car and finds his corpse inside. She calls her mother; Alex answers, believing it to be her husband, angrily lashing out into the phone about his cheating, and hangs up. Sofia takes a revolver from the car and flees. At the house, Sam stumbles upon Ava's dead body and is attacked by a masked assailant. She goes to retrieve the safe key from the pool to get the girls' cell phones back.

Georgie has her throat slashed; Francesca is also stabbed to death. Both of their deaths are streamed on the internet, and photos of their bodies are posted online. Sam retrieves the key and opens the safe, but is attacked again, and locks herself inside. On her phone, she finds photos and videos of her friends' murders posted on a social media game by Cat. Dr. White returns to the house and finds Georgie's body. Sam tells him that Cat has killed Ava and Georgie; Cat emerges and unmasks herself. Believing that Dr. White murdered her father, Sofia shoots him to death.

Witnessing this, Cat flees; Sofia then learns that Cat is the murderer. Sam leaves the house to get help. She encounters Cat on the road, wearing the mask. Alex arrives and witnesses Cat shoot herself in the mouth, killing herself. The film ends with a montage of photos of the murders followed by a video uploaded by Cat, which eventually goes viral and she professes her revenge against the girls, saying that she will "be remembered forever."

== Cast ==
- Chloë Sevigny as Alex Cox
- Timothy Hutton as Dr. Michael White
- Natasha Lyonne as Emma
- Balthazar Getty as Harry Cox
- Taryn Manning as Gloria
- Stella Schnabel as Jamie
- Sadie Seelert as Sam
- Haley Murphy as Cat White
- Bridget McGarry as Sofia Cox
- Blue Lindberg as Ava
- Mina Sundwall as Francesca
- Emma Adler as Georgie
- Annabelle Dexter-Jones as Molly
- Lydia Hearst as Lisa

== Themes ==
In the book Gender and Contemporary Horror in Film, film critic Hannah Bonner notes that the film explores the theme of self-surveillance through the means of documenting life on social media platforms, which "does not lead to autonomy or control of one's self, but to violence and death." Writer-director Subkoff described the film's overarching theme as "cultural narcissism, and how it affects these young women who are killing themselves over being cyberbullied."

== Production ==
=== Development ===
In February 2014, it was announced that Tara Subkoff had written and was going to direct a film starring Chloë Sevigny, Timothy Hutton, Balthazar Getty, Natasha Lyonne, Taryn Manning, Stella Schnabel, Lydia Hearst, and Annabelle Dexter-Jones. Screenwriter Casey Barnhart was brought in to do an uncredited rewrite before production.

In a 2015 interview with Elle, Subkoff said she was inspired to write the film after a discussion with one of her friends' daughters, who had been cyberbullied:

[I]t started because I asked my friend's daughter, "What is horror, to you?" [...] This girl was cyberbullied very badly. So she decided to go away to boarding school in another country—all the way in England. And the cyber bullying followed her there. Now, I was bullied badly as a kid, but I could always change schools. I could always go home. Now you can't...when bullying follows you home, and there's no escape and no end, to me, that's horror. And to so many girls, that's just life.

A fan of horror films since childhood, Subkoff was disinterested in contemporary trends in the genre and instead hoped to emulate a serious strain in horror from around the period of her youth, particularly citing The Exorcist (1973), The Omen (1976), The Shining (1980), Poltergeist (1982), and the films of Wes Craven. Her goal, she said, "was really more about, 'I love this genre from when I was a kid, and I want to explore what it would be like to mix a modern version of a multi-layered genre film.' And I [wanted to] modernize it and really have it be [about something] that feels like a horrible story—a horrible, horrible, horrible thing that's happening to so many teenagers and kids today, that's actually never happened before, so it's totally new and feels really fresh."

=== Filming ===
The film was shot in upstate New York and Connecticut over a period of eighteen days during the winter of 2015. Subkoff described the shoot as "difficult" due to the harsh weather conditions at the time. Prior to shooting, Subkoff spent several weeks doing acting workshops and improvisation exercises with the young cast members in order to prepare the girls for their roles. The house used in the film is located in Bedford, New York.

=== Post-production ===
Subkoff spent nearly seven months editing the film with her editors Janice Hampton and Catrin Hedstrom. The animated sequences in the film were designed by artist Tabor Robak.

== Soundtrack ==
#Horror: Original Score by EMA

Soundtrack album by EMA
- Released: December 11, 2015
- Length: 37:19
- Label: Matador

The soundtrack for to film, titled #Horror: Original Score by EMA, featuring the original score by EMA was released via digital download on December 11, 2015, by Matador Records. On November 20, 2015, prior to the release of the soundtrack, "Amnesia Haze" a song from the soundtrack was released online. A music video for the song was later released.

EMA stated: "Film work and scoring is fun for me because I get to make all this music that wouldn't necessarily fit on an EMA record. We worked really closely with Tara Subkoff on the music. She definitely always had an opinion on what she liked and what she didn't. It was my first score, so I'm not sure if all composers end up spending weeks in a room with the director, but that's how we did it."

Track listing
No.	Title	Length
1.	"Hashtag Horror Theme"	0:55
2.	"Visions of Blood"	0:59
3.	"Amnesia Haze"	3:37
4.	"Surrender, Michael"	2:46
5.	"Whispers"	0:14
6.	"Harshmellow World"	1:41
7.	"Locust Strings"	0:26
8.	"Danger Theme"	1:06
9.	"Cat in the Woods"	1:59
10.	"Running Danger"	3:18
11.	"Dr White In The Woods"	2:24
12.	"Dr White In The House"	5:19
13.	"Foreshadowing Pain"	1:51
14.	"The Girls Were Really Mean"	0:50
15.	"Soul Cycle"	1:40
16.	"Horror #2"	1:02
17.	"Spooky Fingers"	0:17
18.	"#Exit Music"	3:41
19.	"Amnesia Haze (Vox & Guitar Only)"	3:14
Total length:		37:19

- "Amnesia Haze" (Vox & Guitar Only) is a bonus track.

== Release ==
The film was screened out of competition at the Cannes Film Festival Cannes Market section for buyers and distributors in May 2015, with director Subkoff staging an anti-bullying protest outside the event.

On July 31, 2015, it was announced that IFC Midnight had acquired distribution rights to the film. The film screened at the New York City Horror Film Festival on November 12, 2015, and had its world premiere at the Museum of Modern Art on November 18, 2015, both with director Tara Subkoff in attendance. It was released on November 20, 2015, in a limited theatrical release and through video on demand.

=== Marketing ===
On May 15, 2015, images from the film were released. In October 2015, Entertainment Weekly premiered the first trailer for the film. in November 2015, Vanity Fair released an exclusive trailer for the film only on their website. That same month ShockTillYouDrop.com premiered a clip from the film on their website.

=== Home media ===
Scream Factory released the film on DVD and Blu-ray on April 5, 2016.

== Reception ==
=== Critical response ===
#Horror received mixed reviews from critics. On the review aggregator website Rotten Tomatoes, 46% of 12 critics' reviews are positive, with an average rating of 5.7/10. Metacritic, which uses a weighted average, assigned the film a score of 42 out of 100, based on 7 critics, indicating "mixed or average" reviews.

Frank Scheck of The Hollywood Reporter gave the film a negative review, writing: "Infusing its generic horror tropes with vaguely satirical aspects, the film doesn't really work on either level. Unintentionally campy (or purposely, it's hard to tell) and marred by ridiculous plotting and dialogue, #Horror is mostly just a horror." Christine N. Ziemba of Paste gave the film a mixed review, writing: "It's a familiar trope—the killer in the woods hunting a bunch of school girls left home alone—and so much less terrifying than kids armed with their phones, social media accounts, and snark and spite. Despite the issues with #Horror's plot and some of the performances, we're still interested in seeing what Subkoff takes on next."

Chuck Bowen of Slant Magazine gave the film a two out of five-star rating, summarizing it as "a blunt satire of the dehumanization inherent in social media," adding that Sevigny and Hutton "tear into their material with committed lunacy." Jeanette Catsoulis of The New York Times wrote, "for all its bursts of violence and descending-guillotine sound effects, #Horror feels driven more by social commentary than by outright terror. Like a warning to distracted parents, the movie’s scariest threat emerges not from its empty landscapes and sleek interiors (photographed with frosty elegance by Learan Kahanov), but from a seductive online world of likes and followers."

Inkoo Kang of TheWrap gave the film a favorable review, writing: "#Horror undeniably succeeds in its main mission: parodying and scrutinizing the ease with which we capture, recycle, reframe, and desensitize ourselves to even the most horrific images. That makes Blingee possibly the scariest website out there."

== Sources ==
- Bonner, Hannah (2019). "#Selfveillance: Horror's Slut-Shaming through Social Media, Sur- and Selfveillance". In Holland, Samantha; Shail, Robert; Gerrard, Steven (eds.). Gender and Contemporary Horror in Film. Leeds, England: Emerald Group Publishing. pp. 85–100. ISBN 978-1-787-69897-0.
