= Stella Schnabel =

American actress

Stella Schnabel (March 23, 1983) is an American actress and producer. She is the daughter of Belgian clothing designer Jacqueline Beaurang and painter and filmmaker Julian Schnabel.

== Career ==
In the 2002 Red Hot Chili Peppers album, By the Way, Stella’s image was portrayed as the album cover art by her father Julian. Schnabel began dating the band's guitarist John Frusciante in 2001 and the two were briefly engaged but split in 2003. Schnabel also was mentioned in the band's song "The Zephyr Song". "Did you meet your fortune teller? Get it off with no propeller. Do it up, it's on with Stella. What a way to finally smell her."

In 2016, she and Isiah Barr of the Onyx Collective opened the pop up performance venue NYXO in Tribeca.

== Personal life ==
In February 2024, she married communist activist and media heir Fergie Chambers, with whom she later had a son. According to a 2026 Tunisian article on Chambers, she and Chambers are in divorce proceedings.

== Filmography ==
- At Eternity's Gate (2018)
- Hashtag Horror (2015)
- Rampart (2011)
- You Won't Miss Me (2011)
- Miral (2010)
- Before Night Falls (2000)
