= Louvre Atlanta =

Art exhibit in Georgia, United States

Coordinates: 33.79051°N 84.38517°W

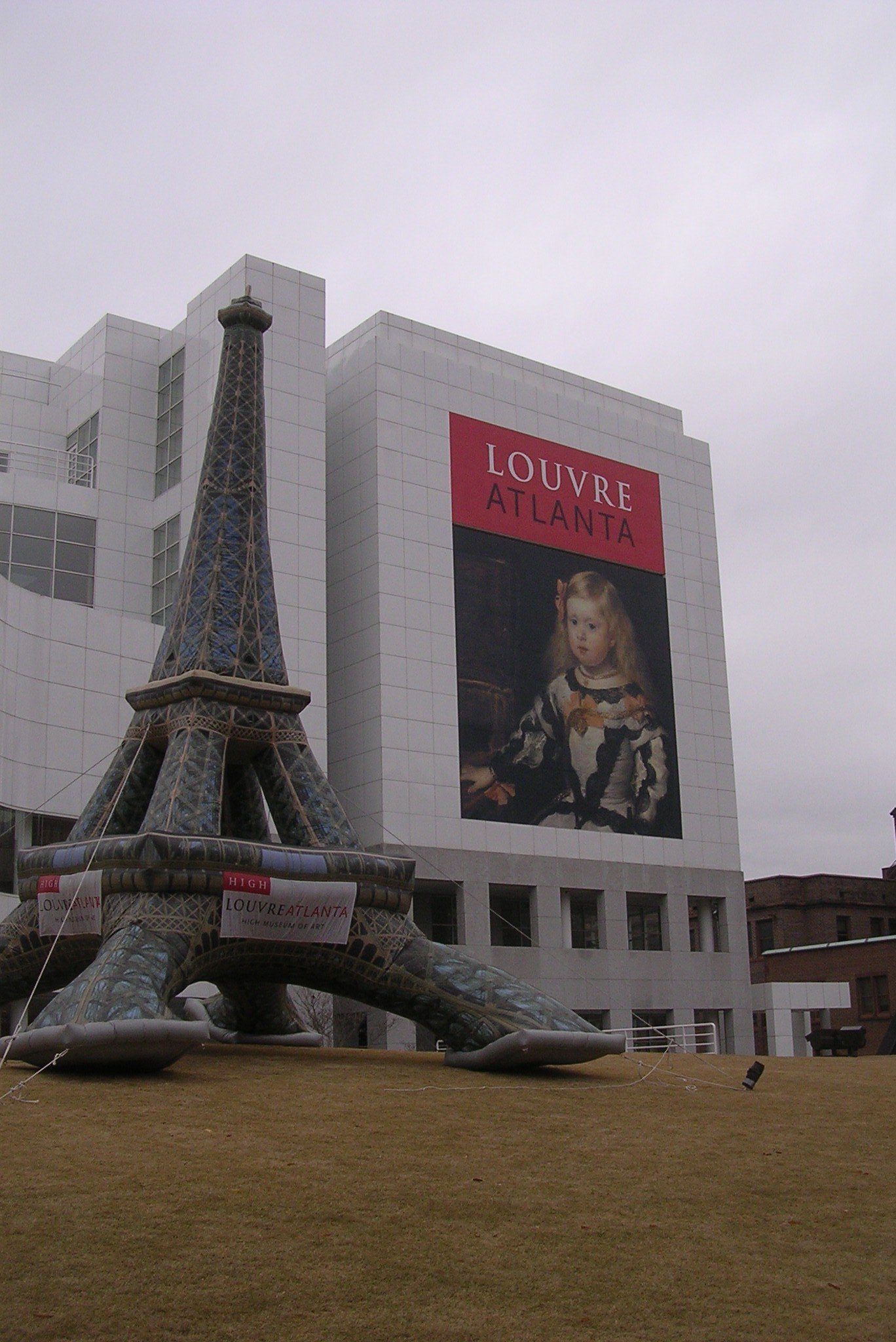
Louvre Atlanta at the High Museum

Louvre Atlanta was an art collaboration showing exhibits from the Louvre in Paris at the High Museum of Art in Atlanta from October 2006 to 2009. The High Museum also held related programs including lectures and art-making workshops.

Three major sponsors included Coca-Cola, Delta Air Lines, and United Parcel Service, all based in or immediately outside of Atlanta. The total budget for Louvre Atlanta was estimated at $18 million. This included a $6.4 million payment by the High which will go towards the restoration of the Louvre’s 18th-century French decorative arts galleries.

Louvre Atlanta was conceived by the museums' directors, Michael Shapiro and Henri Loyrette, who had organized the High's 1999 Impressionism presentation: Paintings Collected by European Museums.
