= Winsor School =

The Winsor School
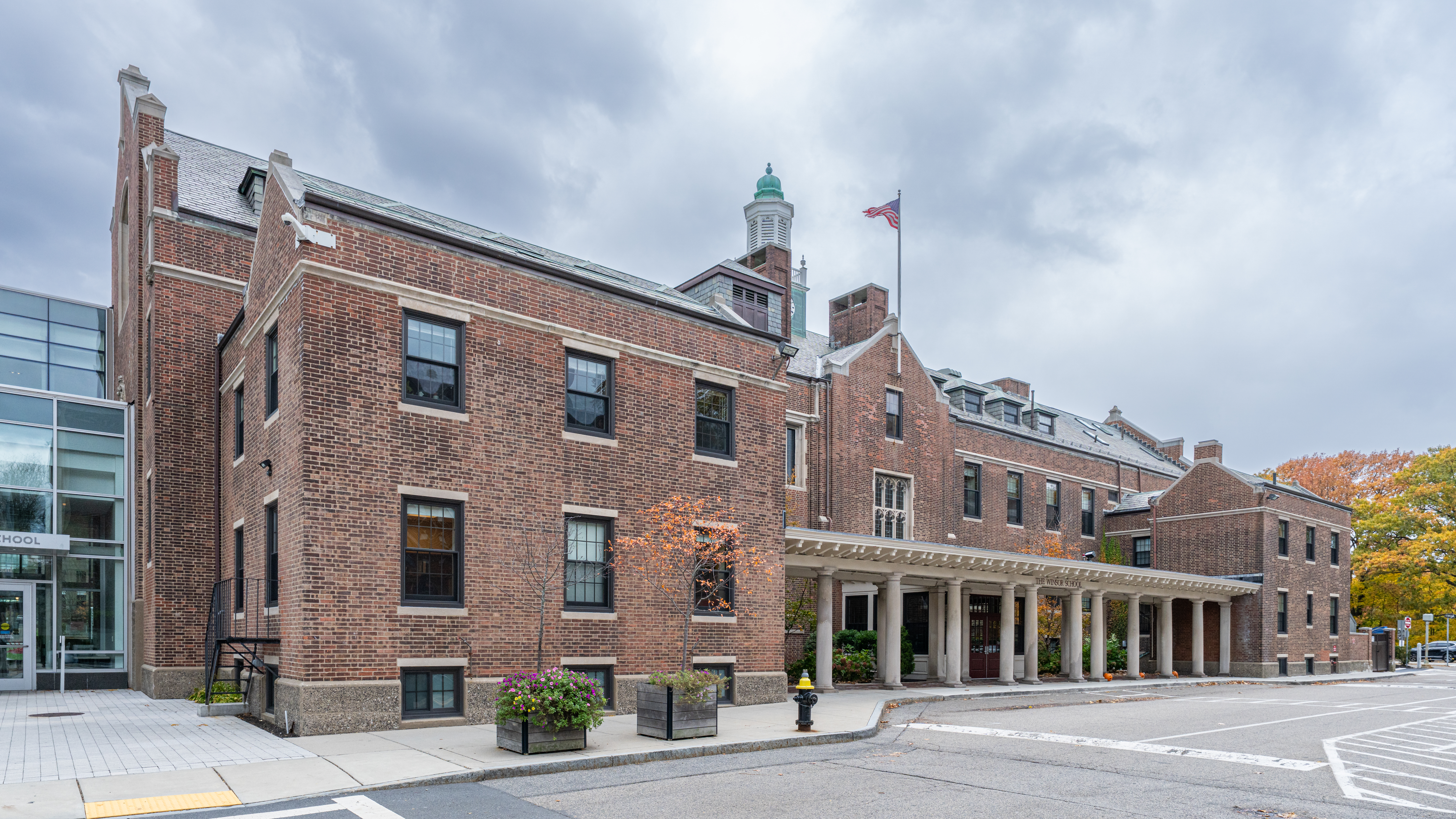

Location
- 103 Pilgrim Road; Boston, Massachusetts 02215; United States; 42°20′26″N 71°6′26″W

Information
- Type: Private, college-preparatory day school
- Motto: A sound mind in a sound body
- Established: 1886; 140 years ago
- NCES School ID: 00603767
- Head of school: Meredith Legg
- Teaching staff: 83.0 (on an FTE basis) (2021–22)
- Grades: 5–12
- Gender: Girls
- Enrollment: 478 (2021–22)
- Student to teacher ratio: 5.8 (2021–22)
- Campus size: 7.4 acres (30,000 m^{2})
- Campus type: Urban
- Colors: Red and White
- Song: The Lamp of Learning
- Athletics conference: Eastern Independent League
- Mascot: Wildcat
- Website: winsor.edu

The Winsor School is a private college-preparatory day school for girls in the Longwood neighborhood of Boston, Massachusetts. It was established in 1886 and educates girls in grades 5–12.

== History ==
=== Founding ===
In 1886, Mary Pickard Winsor started Miss Winsor's School for eight girls (most of whom were her cousin's daughter and friends) in the Back Bay. She had previously taught at her mother's school in suburban Winchester, and began sending her own students to colleges in 1893; enrollment reached 99 girls by 1900 and 225 by 1910. According to the school website, Winsor "wanted to prepare women to be self-supporting, and hoped they would be competent, responsible, and generous-minded." The school moved between various locations in the Back Bay until 1910. One of the old Winsor buildings is featured on the Boston Women's Heritage Trail.

In 1910, a group of wealthy Boston parents built Mary Winsor a brand-new campus in the Longwood neighborhood, at which point the school was renamed to The Winsor School. Designed by prominent Boston architect R. Clipston Sturgis, the campus included a library, science laboratories, art studios, and athletic facilities. The well-equipped campus reflected Winsor's strong base of support among Boston's ultra elite. Mary Winsor's mother's family were eighth-generation Harvard, and Mary's grandfather Henry Ware occupied the Hollis Chair of Divinity at Harvard from 1805 to 1840. When the school formally incorporated in 1907, Harvard president Charles Eliot and Radcliffe dean Agnes Irwin were on its first board of trustees (to this day, the school has deep ties to Harvard, reflected in the incredibly large number of students who go on to attend Harvard each year). Eliot coined the school motto "A sound mind in a sound body."

Mary Winsor also established the present structure of eight classes from grades 5–12, in addition to a ninth, post-graduate year (now discontinued). She retired in 1922.

=== All-girls education ===
Winsor has always been an all-girls school, although Mary Winsor briefly made an exception for her little brother Frederick, who established his own school for boys in 1901. In 1972, Winsor leadership discussed merging with Noble and Greenough School, but talks broke down and Nobles began admitting girls.

Beginning in 1973, Winsor began coordinating after-school activities with two of Greater Boston's remaining all-boys schools: Belmont Hill School (which shares a school newspaper with Winsor, and helped start Winsor's crew program) and Roxbury Latin School, the oldest preparatory school in the country, (which shares various arts productions).

=== Development ===
Winsor has offered a scholarship program since it was incorporated in 1907, although as late as 1970, only "about ten" students received financial aid. The school launched its first scholarship fundraising drive in 1979. Currently, one-quarter of the student body receives financial aid.

The school graduated its first black student in 1970. It also briefly operated a boarding program from 1943 to 1954.

=== Modern times ===
In the 21st century, Winsor has been recognized by various national prep school rating services. In 2006, Boston magazine said that Winsor's college matriculation record was "unmatched" in Massachusetts, with over one-third of alumnae going on to Ivy League schools. From 2019 to 2022, 48 Winsor alumnae (12 per year) matriculated at Ivy League schools; the school graduates approximately 65 students per year.

From 2013 to 2016, Winsor conducted an $82.2 million fundraising campaign, which funded a $75 million expansion with classrooms, athletics facilities, and performing arts facilities. The expansion opened in 2015 and nearly doubled the square footage of Winsor's teaching facilities. It received an award from the American Institute of Architects in 2017. The school announced another fundraising campaign in 2024, which aims to raise $100 million to support faculty salaries and student financial aid.

Winsor's admission rate is roughly 25%. During the COVID-19 pandemic, applications briefly increased by 30%. The school states that its admissions office "selects students for admission without knowledge of who may have applied for tuition assistance."

== Finances ==
=== Tuition and financial aid ===
In the 2025–26 school year, Winsor charged $65,500 in tuition. 25% of the student body was on financial aid. Based on the school's reported $4.8 million financial aid budget, the average aid grant was roughly $41,000.

=== Endowment and expenses ===
Winsor does not publicly disclose the size of its financial endowment. In its Internal Revenue Service filings for the 2021–22 school year, Winsor reported total assets of $205.4 million, net assets of $159.6 million, investment holdings of $100.9 million, and cash holdings of $7.0 million. Winsor also reported $29.1 million in program service expenses and $4.7 million in grants (primarily student financial aid).

== Student body ==
In the 2022–23 school year, Winsor educated 471 girls, 203 of whom were in the Lower School (grades 5-8, or in school jargon, Classes I-IV) and 268 of whom were in the Upper School (grades 9-12, or Classes V-VIII). The school enrolled 63 seniors that year.

Winsor states that 50% of its students identify as people of color. In the 2021–22 school year, the school reported that of its 478 students, 248 (51.2%) were white, 117 (24.4%) were Asian, 22 (4.6%) were African-American, 17 (3.6%) were Hispanic, 2 (0.4%) were Native American, and 72 (15.1%) were multiracial.

== Academics ==
In the Upper School, Winsor requires its students to take four years of English classes and a minimum of: three years of a language, three years of mathematics, two and a half years of history, two and a half years of science, two and a half years of arts, seven semesters of physical education, and three semesters of health and wellness. The school offers 13 Advanced Placement courses, mostly in math, science, and world languages.

Students must also complete the Global Studies program during one semester of their junior year. Students can take both literature and history courses in either Africa, China, India, the Middle East, or Russia, and these courses culminate in an end-of-semester research paper on a specific regional topic.

The school offers many opportunities for its students to engage in STEM fields including electives like engineering design courses that introduce skills such as coding, computer-aided design (CAD), and 3D printing.

== Arts ==
Fifth and sixth graders have drama, arts, and theatre classes interwoven into their schedules. In seventh and eighth grades, however, students can take a wide variety of art electives that include sculpture, Shakespeare performance, dance, set design, painting, digital art, and more.

In the Upper School, Winsor offers electives in drama, dance, visual art, and music. More specifically, drama courses consist of acting, directing, and theatre tech. Dance electives consist of both group and independent dance. Visual art courses consist of painting, drawing, architecture, printmaking, ceramics, photography, and art history. Music electives consist of chamber orchestra, guitar, percussion, music technology, and piano. Winsor also has a choir called Small Chorus and an all-senior a cappella group called Senior Small.

Winsor students frequently put on theatre productions in collaboration with students from the Belmont Hill School and the Roxbury Latin School.

== Athletics ==
Winsor's sports teams compete in the Eastern Independent League. The school offers a variety of sports teams on the varsity, junior varsity, and middle school levels.

Fall athletic offerings
- Cross country
- Field hockey
- Volleyball
- Soccer
- Crew
Winter athletic offerings
- Basketball
- Hockey
- Squash
- Swimming
- Curling (Club)
- Skiing (Club)
Spring athletic offerings
- Track
- Softball
- Crew
- Lacrosse
- Tennis
- Sailing
- Golf (club)

The Winsor crew won eight New England championships in 10 years between 2008 and 2017.

== Facilities ==
Winsor occupies a seven-acre campus in a fashionable neighborhood of Boston, one of the most expensive real estate markets in the United States. In 2014, the Boston Globe estimated that Winsor's 4.4 acres of athletic fields were worth as much as $90 million. The school purchased the fields in 1924 for $90,000 (approximately $1.6 million in March 2024 dollars).

The school has expanded its facilities over the years, including a turf playing field in 2008, a full gymnasium in the 1920s, a science wing in the 1980s, expanding the library more than once, adding classrooms in the 1990s, reconstructing a new dining hall, classrooms, laboratories, and faculty workspace in 2004, and most recently, renovating many classrooms, offices, and corridors.

In 2015, Winsor opened a new addition to the school, called The Lubin O'Donnell Center. It features two gyms as well as music and performing arts facilities.

== Notable alumnae ==
- Tenley Albright, 1956 Olympic gold medalist in figure skating (women's singles); surgeon
- Gale Brewer, representative for New York City's 6th City Council district and former Borough President of Manhattan
- Leslie Dewan, nuclear engineer
- Emi Ferguson, flutist, performer, singer, composer, and professor
- Martha Field, professor at Harvard Law School; third female U.S. Supreme Court law clerk
- Abigail Adams Eliot, educator; founder of the National Association for the Education of Young Children
- Martha May Eliot, public health administrator
- Katharine Fowler-Billings, geologist
- Dorothy Gilman, writer
- Laurie Glimcher, first woman president of Dana–Farber Cancer Institute; professor at Harvard Medical School
- Nancy Hale, writer
- Lorraine Hanlon, U.S. national champion figure skater and physician
- Theresa Helburn, founder of the New York City Theater Guild
- Helen Homans, tennis player; 2-time U.S. Open champion (1x singles, 1x doubles)
- Frances Parkinson Keyes, novelist
- Anne Manson, conductor of the Kansas City Symphony
- Lisa Monaco, federal prosecutor and Homeland Security Adviser to President Barack Obama
- Babe Paley, socialite; International Best Dressed List Hall of Fame
- Sarah Palfrey, tennis player; 15-time U.S. Open champion (2x singles, 9x doubles, 4x mixed doubles)
- Helenka Pantaleoni, silent film actress, humanitarian, and a founder of the U.S. Fund for UNICEF
- Eleanor Ruggles, biographer and book reviewer
- Elizabeth Samet, professor of English at the United States Military Academy
- Eleanor Sayre, art curator and historian
- Suzy Shuster, sports journalist
- Genevra Stone, Olympic rower
- Caroline Farrar Ware, historian and social scientist
- Katharine Sergeant Angell White, fiction editor of The New Yorker
- Mariama White-Hammond, minister and community activist
- Calla Walsh, far-left political activist
