= Anne Cox Chambers =

American businesswoman (1919–2020)

United States Ambassador to Belgium
- In office June 17, 1977 – January 17, 1981
- President: Jimmy Carter
- Preceded by: Leonard Firestone
- Succeeded by: Charles H. Price II

Personal details
- Born: Anne Beau Cox; December 1, 1919 Dayton, Ohio, U.S.
- Died: January 31, 2020 (aged 100) Atlanta, Georgia, U.S.
- Spouses: Louis G. Johnson (m. 1940, divorced) Robert W. Chambers (m. 1955, divorced)
- Children: Katharine Rayner; Margaretta Taylor; James Cox Chambers
- Relatives: James M. Cox (father); Barbara Cox Anthony (sister); James C. Kennedy (nephew); Blair Parry-Okeden (niece)
- Education: Finch College
- Occupation: Media proprietor, diplomat, philanthropist
- Known for: Primary owner of Cox Enterprises

Anne Beau Cox Chambers (December 1, 1919 – January 31, 2020) was an American media proprietor, diplomat, and philanthropist who served as United States Ambassador to Belgium from 1977 to 1981. She co-owned the family company Cox Enterprises, a privately held media empire, with her sister Barbara Cox Anthony for 33 years. Her net worth was estimated by Forbes at $16.1 billion in September 2014.

== Early life ==
Cox was born in Dayton, Ohio. She was the daughter of James M. Cox, a newspaper publisher and politician who was the 1920 Democratic Presidential nominee, and his second wife, Margaretta Parker Blair. She attended the Hacienda Del Sol School for Girls in Tucson, Arizona, alongside Woodrow Wilson’s granddaughters. She later attended Miss Porter’s School in Farmington, Connecticut, and Finch College in New York.

== Career ==
In 1974, upon the death of their brother, James M. Cox (known as "Jim Jr."), Chambers and her sister Barbara Cox Anthony gained a controlling interest in the family company. That same year Chambers became chairwoman of Atlanta Newspapers. Anthony became chairwoman of Dayton Newspapers, while her husband, Garner Anthony, became the administrative head of Cox Enterprises, a large media company that includes newspapers, television, radio, cable television, and other businesses. In 1988 Anthony's son James Cox Kennedy became chairman and chief executive officer. Henceforth Chambers remained a close advisor concerning the daily operation of the company, serving as a director of it.

Chambers was appointed ambassador to Belgium by U.S. president Jimmy Carter, a post she held from 1977 to 1981. She was a director of the board of The Coca-Cola Company during the 1980s, and she was the first woman in Atlanta to serve as a bank director (Fulton National Bank). She was also the first woman in Atlanta appointed to the board of the city's chamber of commerce.

== Philanthropy ==
Chambers was a supporter of a wide range of cultural and educational charities, particularly relating to the arts and international affairs. She served on the boards of the Atlanta Botanical Garden, the Atlanta Historical Society, and the Woodruff Arts Center, as well as on the boards of the Metropolitan Museum of Art, the Pasteur Foundation, and the Whitney Museum in New York. She was elected a Fellow of the American Academy of Arts and Sciences in 2003. In 1983, she received an honorary Doctor of Laws from Oglethorpe University. Following her service in Belgium, she received the French Legion of Honour award.

=== High Museum of Art ===
Her work with the High Museum of Art began in 1965 when Chambers helped to establish the Forward Arts Foundation, a fund-raising group for the museum. In the early 1980s Chambers served as honorary chair of the fund-raising effort to construct the museum's Richard Meier–designed complex. In October 2006, the High, in collaboration with the Louvre in Paris, France, presented the exhibition "Louvre Atlanta"; the partnership had been facilitated by Chambers.

In 2005, the museum named one of the wings of its expanded facility after Chambers in recognition of her lifetime of support.

== Personal life and death ==
Chambers was married to Louis G. Johnson with whom she had two daughters, Katherine and Margaretta. The marriage ended in divorce. In 1955, she married Robert William Chambers, with whom she had a son, James.

Chambers died at her home in Atlanta on January 31, 2020, at the age of 100 due to natural causes. Congressman Carter of Georgia included a note of remembrance in the Congressional Record on February 11, 2020.

Diplomatic posts
Preceded by Leonard Firestone	United States Ambassador to Belgium; 1977–1981	Succeeded by Charles H. Price II
