= Unity of Fields =

Pro-Palestinian protest network

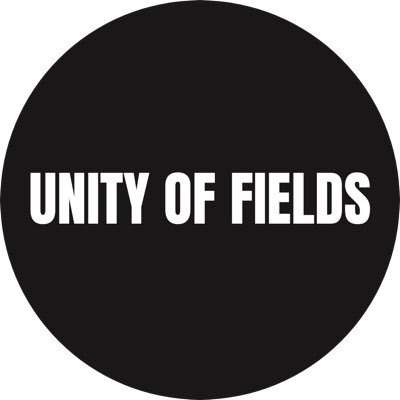
- Formation: 2023
- Type: Activist group
- Legal status: Active
- Region served: United States
- Website: Official website
- Formerly called: Palestine Action US

Unity of Fields, formerly known as Palestine Action US, is an American solidarity organization. It began as the United States branch of Palestine Action, a pro-Palestinian protest network targeting Israeli weapons manufacturers in the United Kingdom. Its earliest known activities began in February 2023, and it began protests in October following the outbreak of the Gaza war. Similar to Palestine Action, the group led a global campaign against Israeli defense electronics company Elbit Systems.

In 2024, the group changed its name to Unity of Fields and announced a shift in focus toward becoming what it described as a "militant propaganda front" targeting the "US-NATO-Zionist axis of imperialism."

== Background ==
The group mobilized during the 2021 Israel–Palestine crisis and has carried out protests since. It was co-founded by communist activist Calla Walsh. The group's earliest known activities began in May 2023, when the group supported an event in the U.S. House of Representatives about the Nakba. The group began identifying itself as Unity of Fields, describing itself in August 2024 as a "militant propaganda front" against what it called the "US-NATO-Zionist axis of imperialism". It was subsequently suspended from some social media platforms.

Its present name references a concept drawn from Palestinian resistance rhetoric, which the group interprets as emphasizing coordination between disparate factions despite ideological or geographic divides. They invoke the broader Axis of Resistance as a model of unified struggle against what they describe as imperialism, Zionism, and fascism. The term "Unity of Fields" has previously circulated in militant discourse, especially following the 2021 Sword of Jerusalem battle, to describe attempts to coordinate action across multiple fronts, even when individual factions were not formally aligned.

== Actions ==
Between October and November 2023, activists affiliated with the group carried out a series of protests and direct actions targeting companies linked to the Israeli defense industry, particularly Elbit Systems, an Israeli defense electronics company. On October 12, activists attempted to shut down an Elbit office in Cambridge, Massachusetts, according to Mondoweiss. On October 20, a separate protest took place outside General Dynamics in Pittsfield, Massachusetts. The company did not comment on its involvement in the war but stated it supported the right to protest.

On October 25, the group protested Elbit Systems at the Wentworth Institute of Technology. On October 30, activists vandalized and protested at Elbit's Boston office, stating they had shut down operations. The group reported that nine individuals were arrested by Cambridge police during the protest. On November 6, the group released footage showing pro-Palestinian slogans, including "Free Palestine" and "Shut Elbit Down", spray-painted on the Arlington, Virginia office of Elbit Systems. It said the site was one of three Elbit locations targeted that night, along with offices in Pennsylvania and Massachusetts. Later that month, on November 17, activists blocked entrances to BNY Mellon offices, citing the bank's investments in Elbit. Subsequently, the NYPD dispersed the protest and detained 20 people.

The group has been accused of encouraging protestors to clash with police and wreak havoc in the streets.

=== Merrimack 4 ===
On November 20, 2023, members of the group targeted an Elbit office in Merrimack, New Hampshire, spray-painting slogans, blocking access, and occupying the roof of the building before being arrested. They were arraigned the following day. The protest was condemned by both the Democratic and Republican parties. The group wrote on X (formerly Twitter) that one was released and the other two had bail set at $20,000. The activists were initially charged with Class B felonies by Attorney General of New Hampshire John Formella; however, the felony charges were later dropped and the activists pleaded guilty to misdemeanor criminal mischief and criminal trespass. They served 60 days in jail as a result.

== Responses ==
In October 2024, Senator Marco Rubio urged the U.S. Department of Justice to investigate Unity of Fields for domestic terrorism.

In August 2026, the related UK group Palestine Action was designated by the US as a terrorist organization.

== See also ==
- Anti-imperialism
- EDO MBM Technology Ltd v Campaign to Smash EDO
- R v Saibene
