= Autotrader.com =

Online marketplace for car shoppers and sellers

Autotrader
- Type: Subsidiary
- Industry: E-commerce software
- Founded: 1997; 29 years ago
- Headquarters: Atlanta, Georgia, U.S.
- Area served: United States; Australia
- Key people: Stephen Rowley (CEO)
- Products: Digital automotive marketplace, pre-packaged software
- Number of employees: 859
- Parent: Cox Automotive
- Website: Autotrader.com; Autotrader.com.au

Autotrader.com, Inc. is an American online marketplace for car buyers and sellers, founded in 1997. It aggregates new, used, and certified second-hand cars from dealers and private sellers. The site also provides users with automotive reviews, shopping advice, and comparison tools for car financing and insurance information. The firm is based in Atlanta, Georgia. Since 2018 it has also been operating in Australia. Autotrader.com is owned by the Cox Automotive subsidiary of Cox Enterprises. It was originally a magazine, started by entrepreneur Stuart Arnold.

== History ==
Autotrader.com was founded in 1997. It was derived from Auto Trader magazine, first published by Stu Arnold in 1973. Freelance photographers would travel to the address of a customer to photograph their vehicle.

Arnold sold the business in 1988 to Cox Enterprises, an Atlanta-based media chain. In 2010, Providence Equity Partners purchased a 25% interest, becoming a minority owner in the company. Kleiner Perkins Caufield & Byers is also an investor.

In 2010, a tool was added to the website to get an instant trade-in offer.

In August 2016, Cox Automotive bought out News Corp Australia's 55% stake in CarsGuide, forming the new automotive venture, Cox Automotive Australia. This eventually led to the launch of the Autotrader.com.au website in October 2018, alongside the Australian arm of Kelley Blue Book. In May 2020, eBay Classifieds group acquired Cox Media, which is the subsidiary of Cox Automotive that runs Autotrader.

== Products and website ==
Autotrader.com offers services that help consumers buy cars, sell cars, or research car purchases. For buyers, the site offers listings of new and used vehicles for sale from dealers and private sellers. It can search for cars through categories: make and model, price range, style, drive type (automatic or manual), engine type, color (exterior and interior), mileage and number of doors.

Those wishing to sell to a dealer can ask for offers from their local area. After taking their car to the dealer to verify its condition, the owner may then sell for the offered price, either as cash or trade-in value. Sellers may purchase an ad package with a description, and upload up to 30 photos.

The firm has an editorial team that reviews new and used cars and provides tips and advice via videos, articles, and social media content. The firm offers its products and services online and on its iPhone, Android, Windows 8, and iPad apps.

The firm owns and operates AutoTraderClassics.com, an online marketplace of classic, antique, and specialty automobiles.

=== Australian branch ===
The Australian branch operates slightly differently due to the specifics of the Australian market. The website styles itself as the 'automotive marketplace where everyone wins.' It suggests that it benefits buyers by providing them with dealer reviews, which allow buyers to review their experiences with sellers, as well as the Price Advisor provided through Kelley Blue Book; while sellers would benefit from having better-informed and more confident buyers.

The website aggregates new, demonstrator and second-hand cars. For buyers, the company provides access to support and guidance, to allow them to make a more educated purchasing decision. They also provide transparent information about the dealer of the car, including the location, the name, a photo of the sales manager, their dealership rating and buyer reviews.

In August 2022, The Market Herald agreed to acquire Gumtree, CarsGuide and Autotrader, a deal completed on 31 August 2022.

== Recognition ==
Autotrader earned the 2010 Most Useful Automotive Site, from J.D. Power and Associates, the 2012 Information Week 500 Award, and the 2013 Dealers' Choice Diamond Awards for both New and Used Vehicle Internet Leads.

== See also ==
Autotrader Group (UK)
