= Margaretta Taylor =

American billionaire heiress (born 1942)

- Born: Margaretta Johnson; 1942 (age 83–84); Atlanta, Georgia, US
- Occupation: Philanthropist
- Known for: holding a 16.4% stake in Cox Enterprises
- Children: 2, including Alexander C. Taylor
- Parent: Anne Cox Chambers
- Relatives: James M. Cox (grandfather); Katharine Rayner (sister); James Cox Chambers (brother)

Margaretta Taylor (nee Johnson, born 1942) is an American billionaire heiress.

She is the daughter of Anne Cox Chambers, and the granddaughter of the newspaper publisher James M. Cox. As of February 2026, her net worth was estimated at US$6.8 billion.

In 2015, her mother Anne Cox Chambers distributed her 49% share in Cox Enterprises equally between her three children: Katharine Rayner, Margaretta Taylor, and James Cox Chambers.

Since January 2018, her son Alexander C. Taylor has been the CEO of Cox Enterprises.
