= Manheim Auctions =

Automobile auction company

Manheim, Inc.
- Type: Subsidiary of Cox Automotive
- Industry: Automotive
- Founded: 1945
- Headquarters: Atlanta, Georgia
- Number of locations: 145
- Parent: Cox Enterprises (Cox Automotive)
- Website: www.manheim.com

Manheim, Inc. is an automobile auction company, a subsidiary of Cox Automotive, a subsidiary of privately owned Cox Enterprises, Inc., based in Atlanta, Georgia. Manheim's primary business is wholesaling vehicles. Other services include financing, title work, and repairs.

== History ==
=== Early history ===
The company was formed by five partners (Arthur F. Walters, Ben Mellinger, Jake Ruhl, Paul H. Stern, and Robert Schreiber) in 1945 in a decrepit building on seven acres just south of Manheim, Pennsylvania, as Manheim Auto Auction, Inc. The first sale offered three cars and sold one to the general public. In 1947, it became a dealer-only enterprise and by 1959, it had grown to become the largest auto exchange in the United States.

By 1966, Manheim Auto Auction was the world's volume leader, selling off 45 vehicles per hour or 700 cars/trucks on a given Friday night at the 16-laned auction. In 1965, Manheim Auto Auction purchased the National Auto Dealers Exchange in Bordentown, New Jersey, and in 1967 it purchased the Fredericksburg Auto Exchange in Fredericksburg, Virginia.

=== Manheim joins Cox Enterprises ===
Cox Enterprises entered the auto auction business in 1968, when it purchased Manheim Auto Auction in Manheim, Pennsylvania. Under Cox, Manheim continued to expand by providing a variety of automotive services, such as reconditioning, recovery, and auto hauling, to dealerships and wholesalers. By the end of the 20th century, the Manheim Auto Auctions had advanced its sales by adding information technology (online sales). Today, Cox Enterprises owns 98% of Auto Trader, one of the world’s leading providers of online and print automotive consumer information.

=== Notable acquisitions ===
In 2006, Manheim became interested in Akinvest Inc. This Canadian company started off as a business that speculated on world automobile values in 1991. The owner, Andrei Kouznetsov, developed a new concept that allowed a foreign dealer to have Akinvest perform all of the necessary procedures to have vehicles delivered to the port nearest to that buyer. By 2005, Akinvest, doing business as Exporttrader, had completely developed the service aspects of the business that assisted non-North American dealers. The organization became known as the leader in the export of used cars from North America. All of the major remarketing companies such as Copart, IAA, ADESA, Carfax and Manheim had foreign transactions that were completed by Akinvest/Exporttrader.

The strength of the procedures used was enhanced by superior programming and automated web sites, retaining enormous banks of data. Export Trader/Akinvest negotiated for new export programs and procedures with the governments of Canada and United States and was consulted numerous times by International law enforcement on global irregularities. Exporttrader was consulted by marketing firms and journals like the Wall Street Journal. to give opinions on global automotive trade and were asked to speak at international conferences. In 2008, Akinvest/Export Trader had 70 employees with offices in Toronto, Moscow and Finland. Akinvest is the parent company of two of the leading players in the export business: Freightmar International and ExportTrader.com.

The agreement was signed in January 2009 for a staged buyout of Akinvest/ Export Trader, transforming the organization under the name WES Exporttrader. The final stage of the transfer to Manheim occurred in late 2014. Subsequently, in April 2015, Manheim closed the Canadian offices of WES Exporttrader and moved the operation to Atlanta. They now run "all new "Global Trader" out of Atlanta. Near the end of March 2016, Manheim Global Export was sold, but it had too many debts and eventually declared bankruptcy.
