= Katharine Rayner =

American billionaire heiress

- Born: Katharine Ann Johnson; 1944 or 1945 (age 80–81); Atlanta, Georgia, US
- Known for: Heiress; 16.4% stake in Cox Enterprises
- Spouse(s): Jesse Kornbluth; William P. "Billy" Rayner (1929 - January 22, 2018)
- Parent(s): Anne Cox Chambers; Louis G. Johnson
- Relatives: Margaretta Taylor (sister); James Cox Chambers (half-brother)

Katharine Ann Johnson "Kathy" Rayner (born 1944/1945) is an American billionaire heiress.

== Early life ==
She was born Katharine Ann Johnson to Anne Cox Chambers and Louis G. Johnson. Her maternal grandfather is James M. Cox. She has a sister Margaretta Taylor, and a half-brother James Cox Chambers, from her mother's second marriage.

== Wealth and Philanthropy ==
In 2015, Rayner's mother Anne Cox Chambers distributed her 49% share in Cox Enterprises equally between her three children. As of February 2026, her net worth is US$6.8 billion.

In 2019, she donated over $5 million to the Animal Medical Center in New York City.

== Personal life ==
She has been married twice. She married Jesse Kornbluth, a magazine writer, on May 26, 1984. They eventually divorced. Her second husband was painter and travel writer William P. "Billy" Rayner, who died on January 22, 2018, at the age of 88.

Rayner lives in East Hampton, New York.
