= Cox Enterprises =

American conglomerate

Cox Enterprises, Inc.

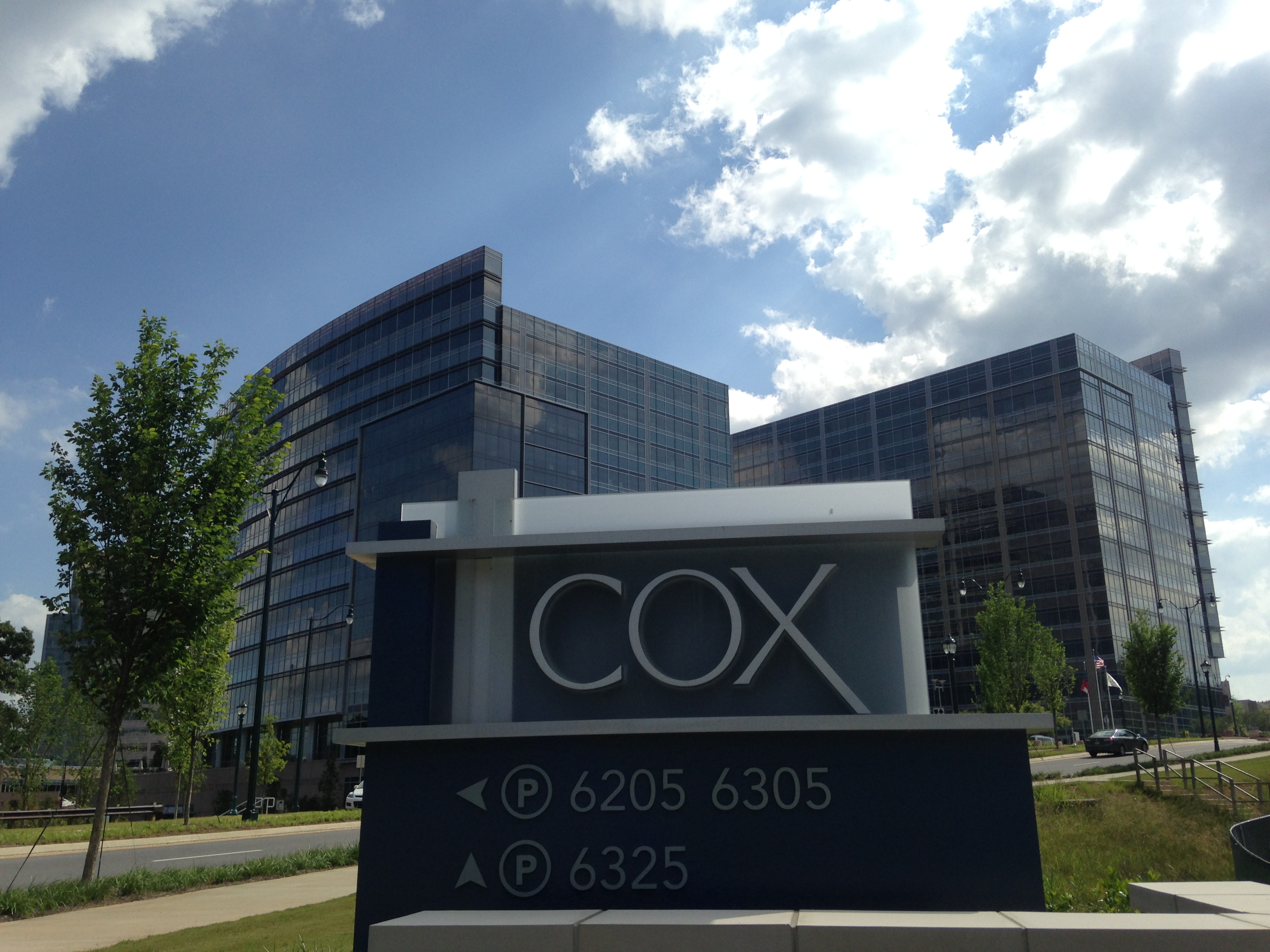
- Cox Enterprises Headquarters park in Sandy Springs, Georgia.
- Type: Private
- Industry: Automotive Services; Communications; Media
- Founded: 1898; 128 years ago in Dayton, Ohio, U.S.
- Founder: James M. Cox
- Headquarters: Atlanta, Georgia, U.S.
- Area served: Worldwide
- Key people: James C. Kennedy (chairman emeritus); Alexander C. Taylor (chairman, president, & CEO)
- Products: Telecommunications; Automotive; Mass media
- Revenue: US$19.2 billion (fiscal 2020)
- Owner: Cox family
- Number of employees: 50,000 (year end 2020)
- Subsidiaries: Cox Communications; Cox Automotive; Cox First Media; Cox Media Group
- Website: www.coxenterprises.com

Cox Enterprises, Inc. is an American privately held global conglomerate headquartered in Atlanta, Georgia, United States, with approximately 55,000 employees and $21 billion in total revenue. Its major operating subsidiaries are Cox Media Group, Cox Communications, and Cox Automotive. The company's major national brands include AutoTrader, Kelley Blue Book, Manheim Auctions and more.

Through Cox Automotive, the company's international operations stretch across Asia, Australia, Europe and Latin America. Cox Enterprises is currently led by Alexander C. Taylor, a fourth-generation Cox family member and great-grandson of founder James M. Cox. James M. Cox's grandson, James C. Kennedy, and other members of the Cox family are on the company's board of directors.

On March 2, 2020, the sale of Cox Media Group's Ohio newspapers was finalized back to Cox Enterprises, and subsequently formed Cox First Media. This move was to ensure that the publications would remain daily newspapers serving the southwest Ohio region.

== History ==
Evolution of Spectrum
- 1898: James M. Cox established a company that grew into Cox Enterprises after he bought the Dayton Evening News
- 1962: Over the next several decades, Cox grew from a local newspaper business into a diversified conglomerate company and established Cox Communications
- 1973: Warner Communications brought together its smaller cable units and began broadcasting The Movie Channel
- 1977: American Express and Warner Cable entered into a joint venture to fund early Pay Television networks, but within eight years, the subsidiary was sold to Viacom
- 1989: Time Inc. and Warner Communications merged into a single company called Time Warner, forming what was the world's largest media conglomerate
- 1992: Time Warner Cable was established as the merged cable unit of Time Warner, and until 2016, it was the second-largest American cable company by subscribers
- 1993: Charter Communications was founded and it merged with Marcus Cable in 1997
- 2001: Heavy debt led to AT&T selling its cable division to Comcast while Liberty Media was spun off to comply with regulations
- 2003: Bright House Networks, a former partnership between Time Warner Cable and Advance Publications, began offering its own standalone services
- 2007: Time Warner Cable acquired parts of the bankrupt Adelphia Corporation, and succeeds it as a partially public company
- 2009: Time Warner spun off its majority interest in Time Warner Cable to focus on being a pure-play entertainment company
- 2014: Several years after emerging from bankruptcy, Charter launched Spectrum as its consumer-facing brand
- 2016: After Comcast withdrew from its attempted buyout of TWC, Charter acquired both Time Warner Cable and Bright House Networks for $89 billion
- 2024: Charter surpassed Comcast as the largest Pay-TV provider by customers
- 2026: After merging with Cox and acquiring Liberty Broadband, the combined entity is set to retire the "Charter" name.

=== Founding ===
The company was founded in Dayton, Ohio, by James M. Cox, who purchased the Dayton Daily News in 1898. Cox became a member of Ohio's delegation to the United States House of Representatives and then the governor of Ohio. He was the Democratic Party candidate for president of the United States in the presidential election of 1920, running unsuccessfully on a ticket that included Franklin D. Roosevelt as the vice presidential candidate.

=== Telecommunications ===
In 1935, at the urging of Governor Cox's son, James M. Cox Jr., Cox entered the radio business starting with WHIO in Dayton. Governor Cox purchased The Atlanta Journal in 1939 as well as radio station WSB. On September 29, 1948, Cox's WSB-TV, later referred to as the "Eyes of the South", aired the first television broadcast in Atlanta. WHIO-TV in Ohio's Miami Valley soon followed, airing its first broadcasts on February 23, 1949.

In 1950, Governor Cox purchased The Atlanta Constitution, and in 1962 his son purchased three cable television systems in central Pennsylvania with a total of 11,800 subscribers. The two combined their broadcasting and cable businesses into the publicly traded Cox Broadcasting Corporation (CBC) in 1964, though the newspaper business remained independent as Cox Enterprises.

In 1966, Cox expanded its holdings to purchase television syndicator Walter Schwimmer, followed in 1967 by the purchase of television production company Bing Crosby Productions. Cox subsequently sold off its syndication unit to a new production company, Telecom Productions, in 1970. Cox would reenter the television syndication business, when Cox's subsidiary, TeleRep, established Television Program Enterprises in the late 1970s, before merging with Rysher Entertainment in 1993.

As the cable business expanded, it was eventually consolidated and spun off into the new privately owned Cox Cable Communications (CCC) in 1968, which quickly became the second-largest cable TV company. Upon Jim Cox Jr.'s death in 1974, he left his two sisters, Anne Cox Chambers and Barbara Cox, in control of 95% of the privately owned company.

In 1982, CBC moved its headquarters to the Atlanta area and changed its name to Cox Communications, Inc. The company was eventually consolidated into Cox Enterprises. In 1988, then-Executive Vice President Jim Kennedy, grandson of Governor Cox, was promoted to CEO and chairman of Cox Enterprises.

In 1986, Cox Enterprises launched a new subsidiary, Cox Video. It lined up eleven commitments for original video programs, four of them from Media Home Entertainment, which are comedy-based tapes, and seven from Fox Hills Video, which are reality-based tapes, both subsidiaries of Heron Communications. Co-production budgets totaled $1.5 million. Cox Video also acquired the rights to produce video adaptations of the magazines and exercise regulations of Joe Weider, which included Muscle & Fitness, Flex and Men's Fitness & Shape. Peter Bieler served as executive producer on tapes produced by Cox Video, and also served as executive vice president of the studio. The company planned regular releases that sometimes used the magazines' names and would be positioned as companions to Weider's widely distributed equipment. The MHE comedies were ranked in the $100,000 range and the Fox Hills tapes in the $100,000 range.

Over the ensuing decades, Cox made pioneering investments and became the first company to bundle telephone, highspeed internet and digital cable television over a single broadband network.

=== Automotive ===
Cox entered the automotive industry in 1965 with the purchase of Black Book. Three years later, Manheim was purchased by Cox as well. In the 1980s, Manheim acquired its first non-U.S. auction in Toronto, Canada, making Cox an international company. In 1997, Autotrader.com was founded.

In 2014, Cox Enterprises brought its automotive-related businesses (which by then included vAuto and NextGear Capital) together under the Cox Automotive name.

In April 2026 Cox Automotive announced its intent to acquire Fullpath, a Jerusalem-based startup. The deal was completed on June 1, for an undisclosed sum reported at hundreds of millions of dollars.

== Subsidiaries ==
=== Cox Communications ===
Logo of Cox Communications

Cox Communications is the third-largest U.S. cable company, serving approximately 6 million residences and businesses. It provides advanced digital video, Internet, telephone and home security and automation services over its own nationwide IP network. The company has also been deploying residential gigabit internet service. In 2019, Cox Communications earned the No. 11 spot on the 2019 DiversityInc Top 50 Companies for Diversity list. This marks the fourteenth time the company has been recognized among the nation's corporate diversity leaders. As of May 16, 2025, Cox Communications will merge with Charter Communications, with the resulting company retaining the Cox Communications name. Cox Enterprises will own 23% of the combined company, and replace Liberty Media as the provider of long-term capital to Charter.

=== Cox Automotive ===
Logo of Cox Automotive

Cox Automotive is a provider of "vehicle remarketing services and digital marketing and software for automotive dealers and consumers." Cox Automotive brands include Manheim, Clutch Technologies, Dealer-Auction Ltd, AutoTrader, Kelley Blue Book, vAuto, Dealer.com, Dealertrack, NextGear Capital, Xtime, Vinsolutions, Dickinson Fleet Services, FleetNet America, and a host of global businesses and brands serving auto dealers, manufacturers and financial institutions.

=== Cox Media Group ===
Former logo of Cox Media Group

Cox Media Group (CMG) is an integrated broadcasting, publishing, direct marketing and digital media company.

In 2019, Cox Enterprises reached an agreement with Apollo Global Management to sell a majority interest in Cox Media Group's broadcast television stations, including the company's radio, newspaper, and TV properties in Ohio, and its local OTT advertising subsidiary – Gamut. Smart Media from Cox. based in New York. On February 10, 2020, Cox Enterprises bought back the Ohio newspapers it sold to Apollo Global Management after the FCC required Apollo to reduce the daily newspapers to 3-day publication or sell them. Cox announced the newspapers would continue 7-day publication.

The Atlanta Journal-Constitution, in addition to the media agency Ideabar, will continue to be part of Cox Enterprises.

== Investments ==
In September 2019, Cox Automotive's Mobility Division entered into an agreement with Rivian, the company developing the first luxury all-electric truck. In the deal, Cox will invest $350 million into Rivian, with the two companies exploring partnership opportunities in service operations, logistics, and digital retailing.

In August 2022, Cox Enterprises agreed to acquire Axios Media, with the deal being valued at $525 million.

In February 2024, Cox agreed to buy out government software company OpenGov, in which it already holds minority interest, with the deal valuing the company at $1.8 billion.
