= Timeline of Brighton and Hove =

The following is a timeline of the history of the city of Brighton and Hove in South East England.

== Prehistory ==
- c. 3650 BC – Activity at Whitehawk Camp starts.
- c. 600 BC – Hollingbury Castle is built, although the site was preceded by a c. 1200 BC enclosure.

== Early history to the 10th century ==
- c. 100 AD – A Roman villa is built near what is now Preston Park.
- c. 270 AD – A fire destroys the Roman villa at Preston Park.

== The 11th to 17th centuries ==
- 1086
  - The Domesday Book records 87 households in the settlement of Bristelmestune.
  - The Domesday Book refers to a church which is believed to relate to St Nicholas Church.
- c. 1093 – St Nicholas Church is granted to the new Lewes Priory.
- 1147 – A new chapel is built and dedicated to St Bartholomew in c. 1185.
- 1170 – A font is carved for St Nicholas Church: the only evidence of the church being older than this is a list of vicars which dates back to 1091.
- 1312 – Edward II grants market rights to Brighton, although this was likely the formalisation of a pre-existing market.
- 1377 – French forces land at Rottingdean during the Hundred Years War and burn the church at Ovingdean.
- 1514 – The village, by this point known as Brighthelmstone, is burned to the ground during a French raid, with the only surviving building being St Nicholas Church.
- 1545 – A map, the oldest known of the area, is presented to the King depicting the raid of 1514. The map also shows the beginnings of Hove, including St Andrew's Church, as well as two windmills to the north of Brighton.
- 1559 – The Old Ship Hotel, the oldest hotel in Brighton, is built.
- 1565 – The parish population is recorded as around 900.
- 1580 – The parish population is recorded as around 1,450.
- 1613 – The Preston Twins, a pair of elm trees believed to be the oldest in the world, are planted.
- c. 1630 – The parish population is recorded as around 2,700.
- 1657 – The parish population is recorded as around 4,000.
- 1676 – The parish population is recorded as around 2,600.

== 18th century ==
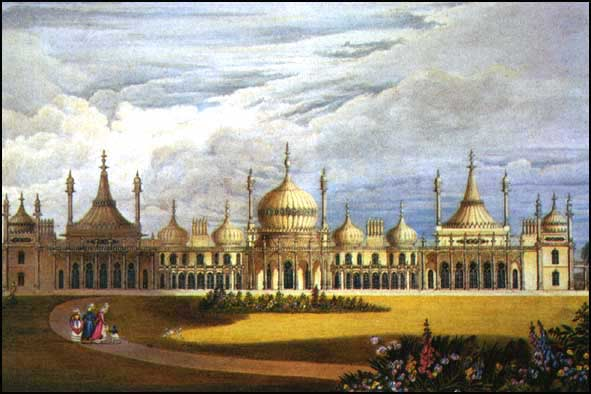
A painting of the Royal Pavilion by John Nash from 1826.

- 1703 – 17 November: The Great storm of 1703 causes significant damage to the town, with Daniel Defoe reporting that it looked "as though it had been bombarded.
- 1722 – Construction starts on Stanmer House.
- 1724 – The parish population is recorded as around 2,250.
- 1730s – Richard Russell begins to prescribe the medicinal use of seawater for his patients.
- 1738 – Preston Manor is rebuilt.
- 1744 – The parish population is recorded as around 2,040.
- 1764 – Patcham Place is almost completely rebuilt.
- 1765 – Marlborough House is built and would later be renovated in 1786.
- 1766 – The population of Brighton is estimated to be 2,000.
- 1771 – Prince Henry, Duke of Cumberland and Strathearn, first visits Brighton, establishing it as a popular resort.
- 1780 – The development of Brighton's characteristic Georgian terraces begins.
- 1783 – George, Prince of Wales, (later King George IV) has his first visit to Brighton.
- 1786 – George, Prince of Wales, rents a farmhouse at the Old Steine.
- 1787 – George, Prince of Wales, begins construction of the Royal Pavilion on the site of his farmhouse.
- 1788 – A census finds the population of Brighton to be over 3,600 prior to a general inoculation due to an outbreak of smallpox which kills 34 people.
- 1790 – Moulsecoomb Place is built.
- 1793 – The Preston Barracks are completed.
- 1794 – An exact census prior to a second general inoculation for smallpox finds the population of Brighton to be 5,669.
- 1795 – The first six Percy and Wagner Almshouses are built.

== 19th century ==
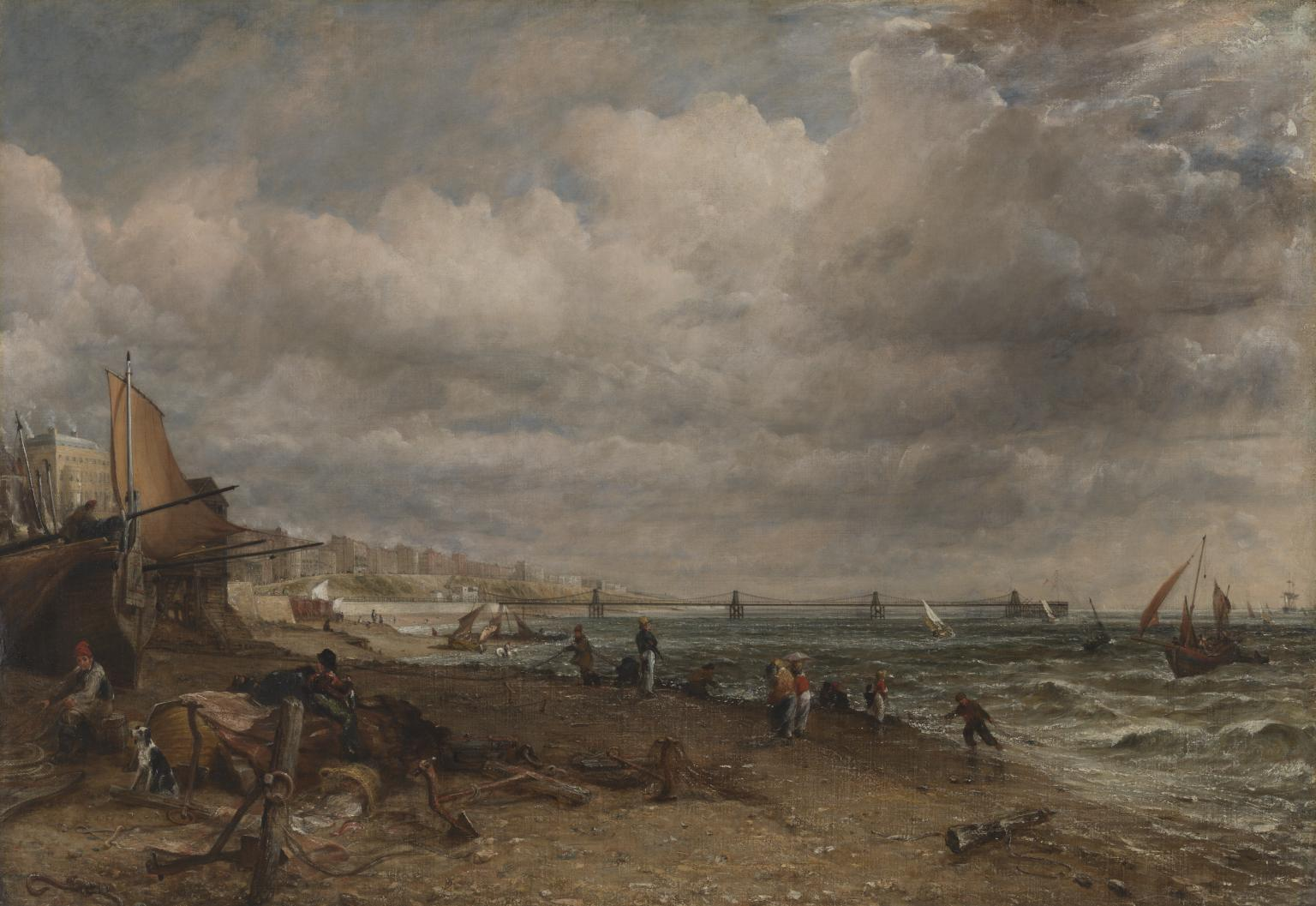
Brighton's Chain Pier, Sussex's earliest pier, was built in 1823. Painting Chain Pier, Brighton by John Constable, 1827

- 1801 – The 1801 census records the population of Brighton to be 7,339 and Hove as 101.
- 1811 – The 1811 census records the population of Brighton to be 12,012 and Hove as 193.
- 1821 – The 1821 census records the population of Brighton to be 24,429 and Hove as 312.
- 1823 – 25 November: Brighton's first pier, the Royal Suspension Chain Pier, is built.
- 1828 – 11 June: Sussex County Hospital (now Royal Sussex County Hospital) opens in Brighton.
- 1831 – The 1831 census records the population of Brighton to be 40,634 and Hove as 1,360.
- 1837 – 27 March: Death of Maria Fitzherbert, longtime companion of the future King George IV of the United Kingdom at her home in Steine House, Brighton.
- 1839
  - 1 March: Sussex County Cricket Club formed, the first county cricket club.
  - An epidemic of whooping cough kills 59 people.
- 1840 – 11 May: The first railway line in Sussex, from Brighton to Shoreham opens.
- 1841
  - An epidemic of smallpox kills 86 people.
  - The 1841 census records the population of Brighton to be 46,661 and Hove as 2,509.
- 1842 – An epidemic of scarlet fever kills 130 people.
- 1849 – An epidemic of cholera kills 194 people.
- 1851 – The 1851 census records the population of Brighton to be 65,569.
- 1861 – The 1861 census records the population of Brighton to be 77,693 and Hove/Preston as 10,668.
- 1866 – 6 October: The West Pier opens after three years of construction.
- 1871 – The 1871 census records the population of Brighton to be 90,011 and Hove/Preston as 13,749.
- 1872 – 10 August: The oldest continuously operating aquarium in the world, Brighton Aquarium, is formally opened following an inauguration by Prince Arthur earlier that year.
- 1881 – The 1881 census records the population of Brighton to be 107,546 and Hove/Preston as 29,333.
- 1891 – The 1891 census records the population of Brighton to be 115,873 and Hove/Preston as 33,720.
- 1896 – 4 December: The Royal Suspension Chain Pier is destroyed during a storm after its closure earlier that year.
- 1899 – 20 May: The Brighton Palace Pier, the only surviving pier in the city, opens after eight years of construction.

== 20th century ==
- 1901 – The 1901 census records the population of Brighton to be 123,478 and Hove/Preston as 50,860.
- 1911 – The 1911 census records the population of Brighton to be 131,327 and Hove as 41,273.
- 1921 – The 1921 census records the population of Brighton to be 142,430 and Hove as 42,571.
- 1926 – 11 May: Angry confrontations known as Battle of Lewes Road take place in Brighton during the 1926 United Kingdom general strike.
- 1931 – The 1931 census records the population of Brighton to be 147,427 and Hove as 55,875.
- 1940 – German air raids on Sussex begin, those in Brighton being known as the Brighton Blitz.
- 1941 – The population of Brighton is estimated to be 127,300.
- 1945 – 8 May: VE Day marks the end of the war in Europe.
- 1951 – The 1951 census records the population of Brighton to be 156,486.
- 1961
  - August: Charter granted to the University of Sussex, the first university in Brighton and Sussex.
  - The 1961 census records the population of Brighton to be 163,159 and Hove as 72,973.
- 1965 – 14 June: Bishop David Cashman is made the first bishop of the Roman Catholic diocese of Arundel and Brighton.
- 1966 – Sussex Downs Area of Outstanding Natural Beauty was designated; it was revoked in 2010 upon the establishment of the South Downs National Park.
- 1967 – The first Brighton Festival and Brighton Fringe are held.
- 1968 – Sussex Police is formed.
- 1971 – The 1971 census records the population of Brighton to be 161,351.
- 1972 – October: Sussex Gay Liberation Front holds a demonstration in favour of gay rights, a precursor to the annual Brighton Pride event.
- 1974 – April: Brighton hosts the 19th Eurovision Song Contest, where Sweden's ABBA wins with their song Waterloo at Brighton Dome.
- 1974 – As part of the Local Government Act 1972 the Lord Lieutenancy of Sussex replaced with one each for East and West Sussex which are made ceremonial counties.
- 1981 – The 1981 census records the population of Brighton to be 149,400 and Hove as 71,049.
- 1982 – At a meeting of the International Whaling Commission in Brighton, delegates vote for a moratorium on commercial whaling.
- 1984 – 12 October: Five people are killed and 31 others seriously injured in the Brighton hotel bombing, an assassination attempt on Prime Minister Margaret Thatcher.
- 1991 – The 1991 census records the population of Brighton to be 153,900 and Hove as 72,083.

== 21st century ==
- 2000 – Brighton and Hove is granted city status.
- 2001 – 29 April: The 2001 census records the population of Brighton to be 157,960 and Hove as 95,822.
- 2011
  - 27 March: The 2011 census records the population of Brighton to be 155,919 and Hove as 91,880.
  - 1 April: South Downs National Park becomes fully operational.
- 2014 – UNESCO designates land between the Rivers Adur and Ouse to be the Brighton and Lewes Downs Biosphere Reserve, Sussex's first UNESCO Biosphere Reserve.
- 2018
  - The Rampion Wind Farm becomes operational, a wind farm that lies off the Sussex coast between Worthing and Seaford.
  - 3 October: Prince Harry and Meghan Markle make their first official visit to Brighton as Duke and Duchess of Sussex.
- 2020 – 6 February: The first case in Brighton of COVID-19 was reported when a man who returned from Singapore and France to Brighton on 28 January.
- 2021
  - March: DEFRA announces a bylaw first proposed by the Sussex IFCA to prevent trawling on 304 square kilometres (117 sq mi) of sea bed off the coast of Sussex. The law should help the rewilding and regeneration of the Sussex kelp forest.
  - 21 March: The 2021 census records the population of Brighton and Hove to be 277,105.
