= History of Brighton =

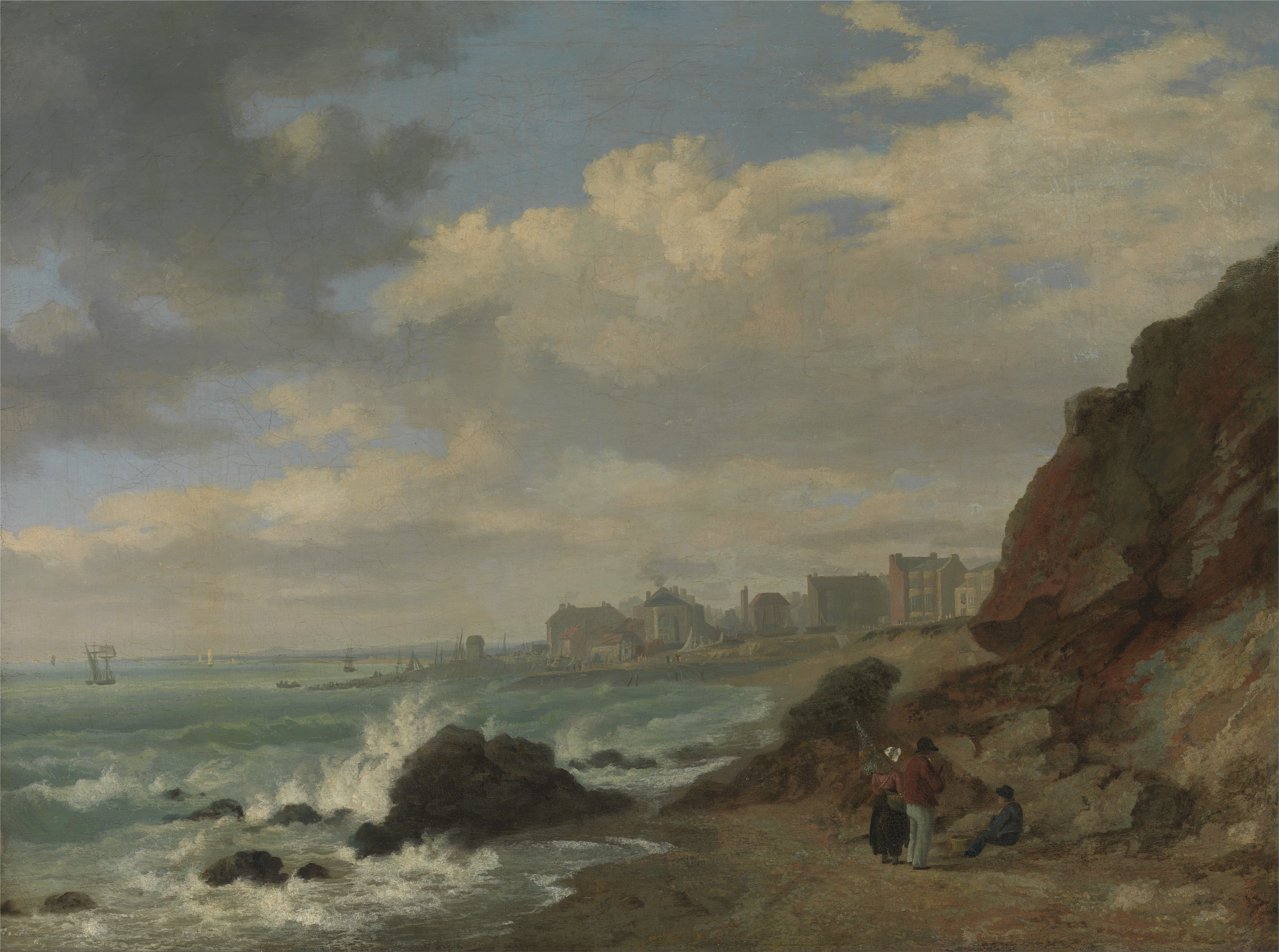
Brighton, 1817 painting by William Henry Stothard Scott

The history of Brighton is that of an ancient fishing village which emerged as a health resort in the 18th century and grew into one of the largest towns in England by the 20th century.

== Etymology ==
The etymology of the name of Brighton lies in the Old English Beorhthelmes tūn (Beorhthelm's farmstead). This name has evolved through Bristelmestune (1086), Brichtelmeston (1198), Brighthelmeston (1493), Brighthemston (1610) and Brighthelmston (1816). Brighton came into common use in the early 19th century.

== Prehistoric period ==
=== Palaeolithic ===
The western section of the cliffs at Black Rock, near Brighton Marina are an unusual outcropping of Palaeolithic Coombe Rock, revealing in section a paleocliff cut into Cretaceous Chalk. These rocks were formerly known as the "Elephant Beds" in reference to the fossilised material recovered by geologists and palaeontologists. 200,000 years ago the beach was significantly higher and this clear strata can be observed preserved in the cliff. Protohumans (assumed to be the same species of hominid found at the Neander Valley) hunted various animals including mammoth along the shore. The preservation of this raised beach and associated evidence of a coastal paleolandscape has led to protected status for the cliff. This section can be seen directly behind the car-park of supermarket Asda.

=== Neolithic period ===
Whitehawk Camp is an early Neolithic causewayed enclosure c. 3500 BC. The centre is some way towards the transmitter on the south side of Manor Road (which bisects the enclosure), opposite the Brighton Racecourse grandstand. Archaeological enquiry (by the Curwens in the 1930s and English Heritage in the 1990s) have determined four concentric circles of ditches and mounds, broken or "causewayed" in many places. Significant vestiges of the mounds remain and their arc can be traced by eye. The building of a new housing estate in the early 1990s over the southeastern portion of the enclosure damaged the archaeology and caused the loss of the ancient panoramic view.

The fate of a Neolithic long barrow at Waldegrave Road is recorded. It was used as hardcore during the building of Balfour Road and workmen were regularly disturbed by the concentrations of human remains poking through their foundations.

More of pre-historic Brighton and Hove can be seen just north of the small retail park on Old Shoreham Road, built in the late 1990s over the site of Brighton's football ground. Here one can visit The Goldstone. This is believed to have been ceremonial, and there are suggestions that it, together with now-vanished stones, may have formed an ancient circle. In the early 19th century a local farmer, fed up with romantic tourists, had the largest stone buried. It was exhumed in 1900.

=== Bronze Age ===
After a scholarly review, the Institute of Archaeology and Antiquity noted, "there are a concentration of Beaker burials on the fringes of the central chalklands around Brighton, and a later cluster of Early and Middle Bronze Age 'rich graves' in the same area."

=== Iron Age ===
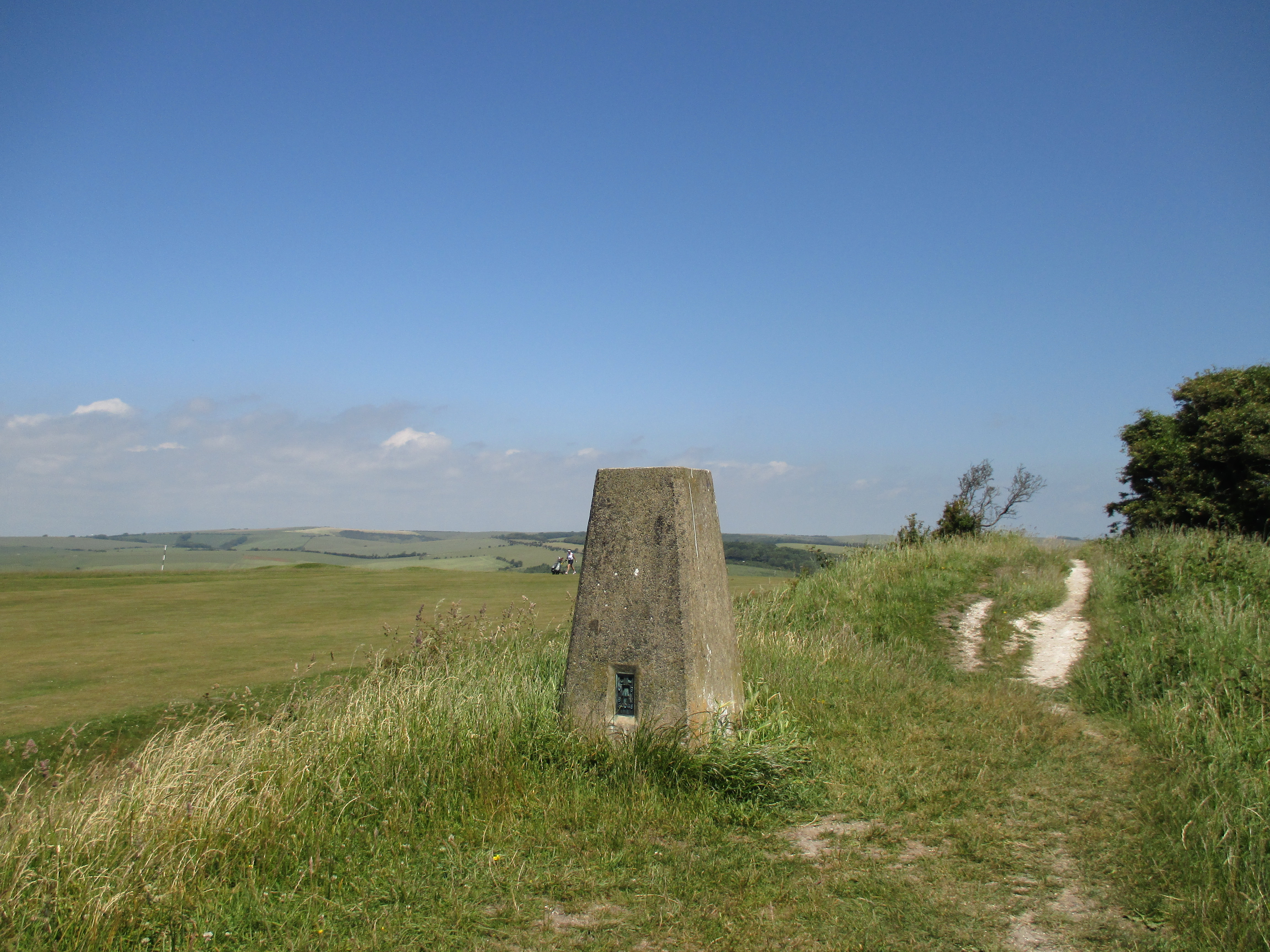
The trig point at the summit of Hollingbury Castle

An important pre-Roman site is Hollingbury Castle (or Hollingbury Hillfort). Commanding panoramic views over the city, this Celtic Iron Age encampment is circumscribed by substantial earthwork outer walls with a diameter of approximately 300 metres. It is one of numerous hillforts found across southern Britain. Cissbury Ring, roughly 10 miles (16 km) from Hollingbury, is suggested to have been the tribal "capital".

== Romano-British period ==
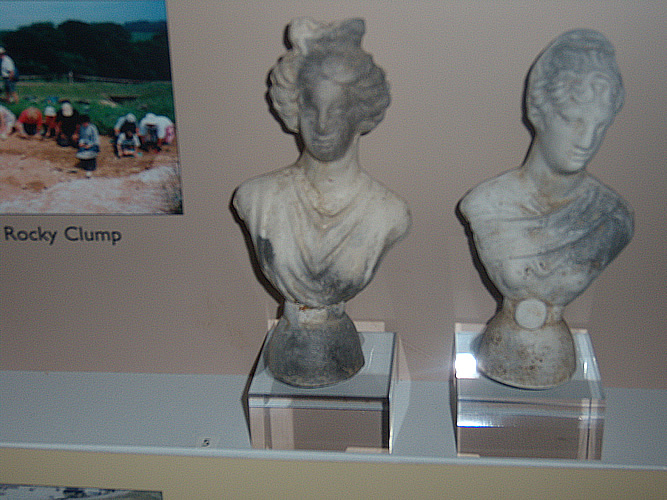
Two terracotta figures found in a grave of a woman, next to the Roman villa at Brighton

The Romans built villas throughout Sussex, including a villa at Brighton. At the time of its construction in the late 1st or 2nd century AD there was a stream running along what is now London Road. The villa was sited more or less at the water's edge, immediately south of Preston Park. The villa was excavated in the 1930s, prior to the building of a garage on the site.

In Brighton museum, within the new Brighton and Hove Archaeological Society display (Autumn 2006), visitors can view two Roman figurines unearthed from the Brighton Roman Villa. Rocky Clump, in Stanmer Park, to the north of the city, was a Romano-British farming settlement.

A Roman road leads from Shoreham-by-Sea through Hove to Brighton, where it turns and leads north to Hassocks, a Roman industrial centre. No significant Roman settlement has been found in Brighton or Hove. However the presence of the Roman roads, the high number of Roman artefacts, and significant changes in geography (due to sedimentation and erosion) could mean that any possible settlement is either buried or may have been washed away by the sea.

Despite the Romano-British construction of numerous shore forts along the south coast (significant extant examples can be visited at Portsmouth to the West and Pevensey to the East) the battle to ward off Saxon raiders was eventually lost after the official withdrawal of Roman resources in AD 410.

== Middle Ages ==
=== Anglo-Saxon period ===
After the collapse of the Roman Empire in the 5th century, Saxons arrived in and around Brighton and the area became part of the Kingdom of Sussex. From around 827 Sussex was annexed by the neighbouring Kingdom of Wessex, which evolved into the Kingdom of England. The placename of Brighton means "Beorhthelm's farm", and this placename and those of neighbouring places date from this era. A 6th-7th century Saxon burial area has been excavated around the Seven Dials area.

Like other settlements on the coast of south-east England, Brighton appears to have developed as a landing-place for boats; the early function of the landing-place as a fishing centre is reflected in payment from one manorial holding of a rent of 4,000 herrings recorded in Domesday Book shortly after the end of the Saxon period in 1086. There is no suggestion in Domesday Book, however, that Brighton was a town – the manors were inhabited by villagers and smallholders, not burgesses. The Domesday Book also records that at the close of the Saxon period, Brighton was held by Earl Godwin, who was probably from Sussex and was one of the most powerful earls in England. Godwin had extensive land holdings in Sussex and was the father of King Harold, the last Anglo-Saxon king of England.

=== Norman Conquest ===
After the Norman Conquest, King William I conferred the barony of Lewes to his son-in-law William de Warenne. The Domesday Book of 1086 contains the first documentary evidence of a settlement on the modern site of Brighton. Located in the rape of Lewes and in the Welesmere hundred, the settlement was made up of three manors, the first being described as Bristelmestune.

Ralph holds of William BRISTELMESTUNE. Brictric held it by grant (de dono) of Earl Godwin. In the time of King Edward, as (et) now, it was assessed for 5½ hides. There is land for 3 ploughs. On the demesne is half a plough, and (there are) 18 villeins and 9 bordars with 3 ploughs and 1 serf. From gafol-rents 4,000 herrings. In the time of King Edward it was worth 8 pounds and 12 shillings; and afterwards 100 shillings; now 12 pounds.

In the same vill Widard holds of William 6 hides and 1 virgate, and for so much they are assessed. Three alodial tenants held them of King Edward, and could betake themselves whither they would. One of them had a hall, and villeins held the shares of the other two. There is land for 5 ploughs, and is (all) in one manor. On the demesne (is) 1 plough and a half, and (there are) 14 villeins and 21 bordars with 3½ ploughs. There (are) 7 acres of meadow, and wood (land yielding) 3 swine. In Lewes (are) 4 haws. In the time of King Edward (this) was worth 10 pounds, and afterwards 8 pounds; now 12 pounds.

In the same place William de Wateville holds BRISTELMETUNE of William. Ulward held it for King Edward. Then, as (et)now, it was assessed for 5½ hides. There is land for 4 ploughs. On the demensne is 1 plough, and (there are) 13 villeins and 11 bordars with 1 plough. There (is) a church. In the time of King Edward it was worth 10 pounds, and afterwards 8 pounds; now 12 pounds.

— Domesday Book

=== 12th century ===
Brighton had probably acquired a town-like status by the 12th century, although it would not have had the facilities of longer established Sussex boroughs such as Lewes or Steyning. Established by the monks at the mother church of St Pancras Priory, Lewes between 1120 and 1147, St Bartholomew's Priory stood on the site of the present town hall. The consonant structure of the placename Brighthelmston (i.e. B-R-T-L-M) may have suggested the dedication of the priory to St Bartholomew. This small dispatchment of Cluniacs established the monastery submitting themselves to a regular life under the Rule of St Benedict.. The 12th-century font in Brighton's old parish church of St Nicholas is described by Pevsner as "the best piece of Norman carving in Sussex". The font suggests that St Nicholas Church was also originally built in the 12th century, although the current structure dates mainly from the 13th century. The church was also held by Lewes Priory.

=== 14th century ===
The regular planning of the town as it existed from at least the 15th century suggests that Brighton was deliberately laid out around 1300, possibly under the influence of the planned new town of Winchelsea some 45 miles (72 km) to the east. In 1312 King Edward II granted market rights to the village and the right to hold an annual fair on the eve, day and morrow of St. Bartholomew 23, 24 and 25 August, although it is likely that grant simply formalised a market that was already in existence by this time.

St Peter's Church at Preston Village, Brighton, currently under the care of the Churches Conservation Trust, is 14th century. A medieval fresco depicting the murder of Thomas Becket was discovered under paint following a fire in the early 20th century. The fresco is among the oldest art in Brighton.

== Early modern period ==
In June 1514, the fishing village (by then known as Brighthelmstone) was burnt to the ground by the French as part of a war which began as a result of the Treaty of Westminster (1511). Subsequently in 1545 the residents of the town petitioned the monarch for defensive cannon. Their petition featured an illustrated map showing the French raid, a copy of which can be seen in Hove Museum.

This map is the earliest known picture of Brighton. It shows a site laid out in a rectangular shape about a quarter of a mile square. The lower town of houses on the foreshore can be seen with a series of sloping ways rising eastwards up the cliff. Middle Street came into existence during the 16th century and West Street, North Street and East Street were fully developed by the 16th century. However the interior between Middle Street and East Street remained undeveloped and was known as the Hempshares.

The lower town on the foreshore suffered from sea erosion. In 1665 there were 113 houses out of a former 135. However, as only 24 of these houses paid Hearth Tax in that year, it is suspected that many of these dwellings were mere hovels. By the 1640s Brighthelmstone had a population of over 4,000 and was the largest settlement in Sussex. Its economy was dominated by the fishing industry.

Deryk Carver, a Flemish brewer whose premises were on Black Lion Street, was arrested by the Sheriff, Edward Gage, for heresy. Carver had rejected the authority of the Roman Catholic Church and what he saw as its continuing role as an instrument of state power. Carver and others were dispatched for trial in London and ultimately executed at the county town of Lewes. Carver was stood in a barrel of pitch and burned alive.

After his defeat at the Battle of Worcester, Charles II escaped to France through Brighton and finally Shoreham-by-Sea. This event is remembered annually by the Royal Escape yacht race, now organised by Sussex Yacht Club. The tomb of the boat-owner who was instrumental in the escape of Charles II, Nicholas Tettersell, is to be seen in St Nicholas churchyard, Brighton.

Two elm trees in the grounds of Preston Manor are the oldest English elms in the world. They are thought to be 400 years old.

== Late modern period ==
=== Early 18th century decline ===
Brighton's period of relative prosperity in the 17th century was followed by a slow decline into the 18th century due to a fall in the demand for fish, and sea erosion. The Great Storm of 1703 caused considerable damage to the town. Daniel Defoe reported that the storm:

Stript a great many houses, turn'd up the lead of the church, overthrew two wind-mills, and laid them flat on the ground, the town in general (at the approach of daylight) looking as though it had been bombarded.

— Daniel Defoe, The Storm

A second storm in 1705 destroyed the lower town and covered the wreckage of the houses with shingle. The fortifications of the west cliff were destroyed in 1748. Proposed sea defences at a cost of £8,000 were described by Defoe as "more than the whole town was worth".

In 1720, antiquary John Warburton, travelling along the south coast, reported:

I arrived at Bright-hems tead, a large, ill-built, irregular market town, mostly inhabited by sea-faring men, who choose their residence here, as being situated on the main, and convenient for their going on shore, on their passing and re-passing in the coasting trade. The town is likely to share the same fate with the last [Hove], the sea having washed away the half of it; whole streets being now deserted, and the beach almost covered with walls of houses being almost entire, the lime or cement being strong enough, when thrown down, to resist the violence of the waves. The church is situated on the downs, at a furlong distance from the town; it is large, but nothing about it worthy of remark, or in the town; there not being any person of fortune in the town but one Masters (or Morley?) a gentleman of good birth.

— John Warburton

By the mid-18th century the population had fallen to 2,000

=== Health resort and royal patronage in the late 18th century ===
During the 1730s, Dr Richard Russell of Lewes began to prescribe the medicinal use of seawater at Brighthelmstone for his patients. He wrote a tract advocating the drinking of seawater and sea bathing in 1750. In 1753 he erected a large house on the southern side of the Steine for his own and patients' accommodation.

In 1758, Dr. John Awsiter, another prominent local doctor, also wrote a paper advocating drinking seawater and seabathing.

Still another local doctor, Anthony Relhan (ca. 1715–1776) published a tract in 1761 advocating the consumption of mineral waters and sea-bathing. This increased interest in the use of the local mineral waters for drinking and bathing. By 1769 the cornerstone of the Brighton Baths was laid.

After Dr Russell's death in 1759, his house was let to seasonal visitors including the brother of George III the Duke of Cumberland in 1771. On 7 September 1783 the Prince of Wales, later the Prince Regent, visited his uncle, whose taste for gaming and high life matched his own. The Prince's subsequent patronage of the town for the next forty years was central to the rapid growth of the town and the transition of the fishing village of Brighthelmston to the modern town of Brighton. Rex Whistler's famous cheeky satire The Prince Regent Awakens the Spirit of Brighton is on view at the Brighton Pavilion.

Currently enjoying restoration, Marlborough House on the Old Steine was built by Robert Adam in 1765 and purchased shortly afterwards by the fourth duke. By 1780, development of the Georgian terraces that characterise the classic Brighton streetscape had started, and the town quickly became the fashionable resort of Brighton. The growth of the town was further encouraged when, in 1786, the young Prince of Wales, later the Prince Regent and George IV, rented a farmhouse to make a public demonstration of his new-found fiscal sobriety. He spent much of his leisure time in the town, where he set up a discreet establishment for his mistress Mrs Fitzherbert and constructed the exotic Royal Pavilion, which is the town's best-known landmark.

A permanent military presence was established in the city with the completion of Preston Barracks in 1793.

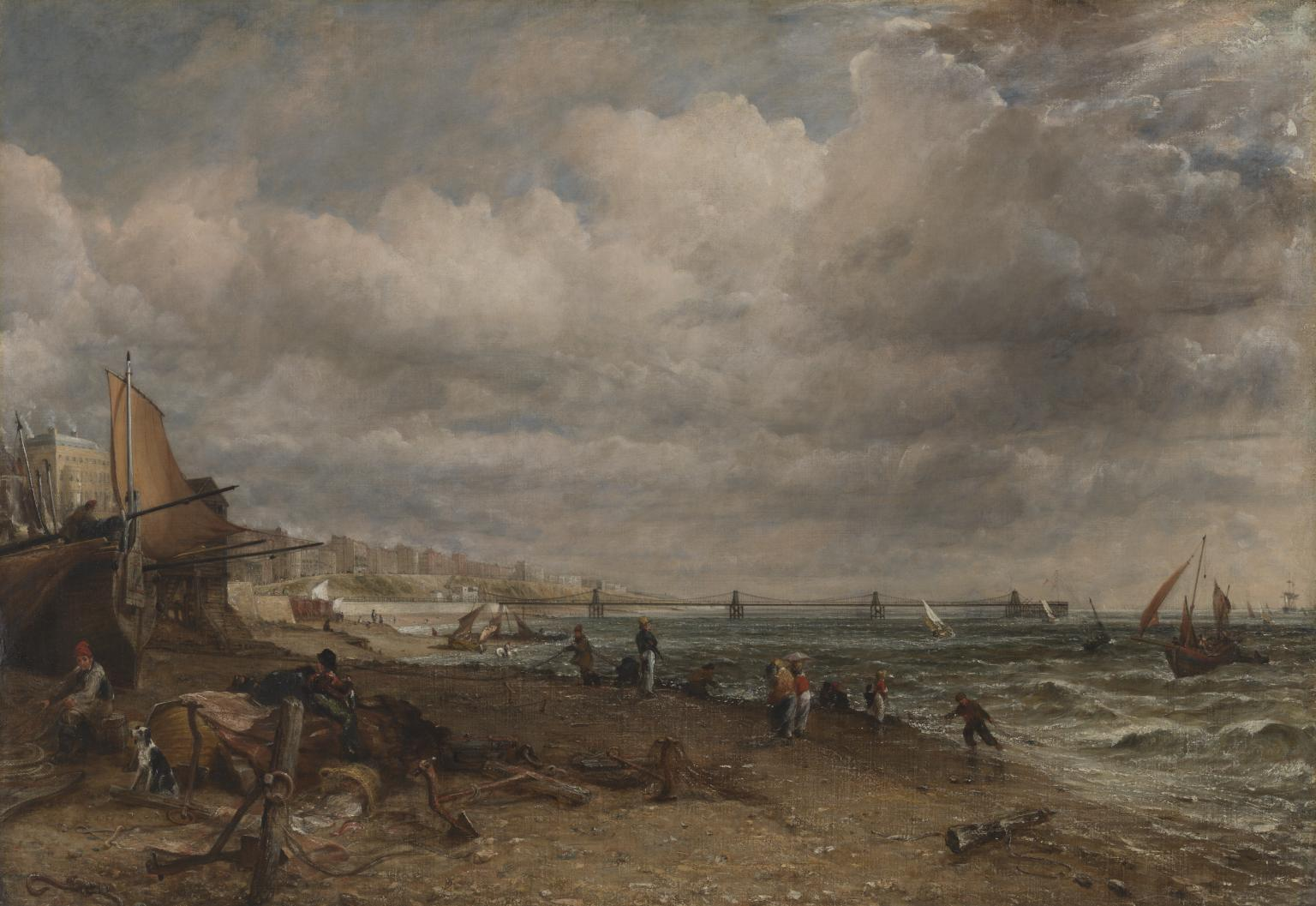
Chain Pier, Brighton by John Constable, 1827

One of many tributes to the growing resort came from the travelling entertainer and poet Elizabeth Beverley, who contributed to the Brighton Herald on 15 August 1818 a poem that begins, "Hail, favour'd spot, divine retreat! / Sweet refuge from Sol's scorching heat... / Who from the village, rose thy state / To be a town superb and great..."

The Kemp Town estate (at the heart of the Kemptown district) was constructed between 1823 and 1855, and is a good example of Regency architecture.

=== 19th century and pre-war period ===
Brighton's popularity with the rich, famous, and royal continued in the 19th century, and saw the building of a number of imposing seafront hotels, including the Bedford Hotel of 1829, the Grand Hotel of 1864, and the Metropole Hotel of 1890. The Church Street drill hall was also completed in 1890.

The city's popularity among the wealthy rose with the decision of the Prince Regent to build a seaside palace, the Royal Pavilion. Construction began in 1787, but it is the expansion by John Nash beginning in 1811 that created the fantastical Orientalist pavilion that draws the eye and made Brighton a center of Regency Era society.

Gideon Algernon Mantell lived on the Steine close to the seafront in the early part of the 19th century; his residency is commemorated on a plaque at the house. Mantell identified the iguanadon from a fossilised tooth found locally and was an early theorist of a prehistoric age when the earth was ruled by giant lizards.

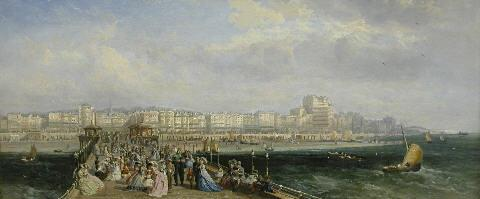
View of Brighton pier as it looked like in the 19th century. Painting by James Webb

Brighton came to be of importance to the railway industry after the building of the Brighton railway works in 1840. This brought Brighton within the reach of day-trippers from London, who flocked to peep at Queen Victoria, whose growing family were constrained for space in the Royal Pavilion; in 1845 she purchased the land for Osborne House in the Isle of Wight and left Brighton permanently. In 1850 the Pavilion was sold to the Corporation of Brighton.

In 1859 the municipal Brighton School of Art was founded, which became part of Brighton Polytechnic as the Faculty of Art and Design and is now the Faculty of Arts and Architecture of the University of Brighton.

In 1882 Robert Hammond established a company to supply electricity to enable shopkeepers located in Queen’s Road and Western Road to install electric lighting in their premises.

In the latter half of the 19th century a large number of churches were built in Brighton. This was in large part due to the efforts of Reverend Arthur Douglas Wagner, a prominent figure in the Anglo-Catholic movement of the time. He is thought to have spent his entire fortune on building a number of churches including St. Bartholomew's – an imposing red brick building, built to the size and proportions of the biblical ark. Other notable Victorian churches in Brighton include the Parish Church of St. Michael and All Angels, which has stained glass windows by the pre-Raphaelites, William Morris, Edward Burne-Jones, Ford Madox Brown and Philip Webb.

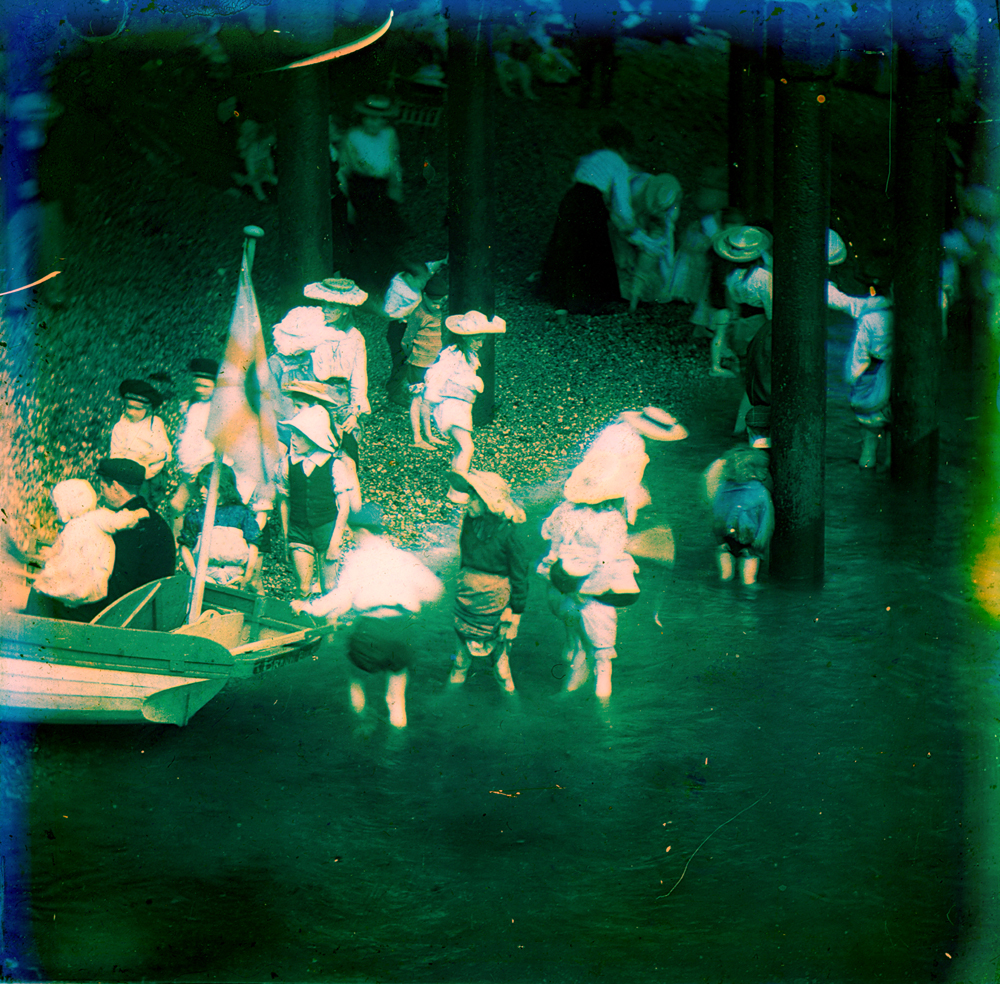
Three-colour lantern slide of children playing on a Brighton beach, 6 August 1906, by Otto Pfenninger

In the early 20th century, Otto Pfenninger developed one of the earliest method of colour photography in the parks and beaches of Brighton.

=== First World War ===
Between 1 December 1914 and 15 February 1916 the Royal Pavilion was used as a military hospital for Indian soldiers with a total of 724 beds. It admitted a total of 4,306 patients. From 20 April 1916 until 21 July 1919, the Pavilion was designated the Pavilion General Hospital (for limbless men) and admitted 6,085 patients. The 2nd Eastern General Hospital occupied the boys' grammar school, elementary schools and the workhouse. Brighton was the location of the Third Australian Hospital and also the first hospital in Britain for shell shock cases. During the war 233 London, Brighton and South Coast Railway ambulance trains carried 30,070 patients to Brighton.

In June 1916 the sound of the guns firing at the Battle of the Somme were heard on the Brighton College playing field during cricket.

The Brighton War Memorial in Old Steine was unveiled by Earl Beatty on 7 October 1922 bearing the names of 2,597 men and 3 women of the town who died in military service.

The Chattri is a memorial to the Indian soldiers who died at the Royal Pavilion hospital. It is situated on the Downs to the north of Patcham on the outskirts of the town. It is an octagonal monument built on the place of cremation for Hindu and Sikh soldiers and was unveiled by the Prince of Wales on 1 February 1921.

=== Post-war period ===
In many ways, Brighton's post-war growth has been a continuation of the "fashionable Brighton" which drew the Georgian upper classes. The growth in mass tourism stimulated numerous Brighton businesses to serve visitors. Pubs and restaurants are abundant. An important post-war development was the 1961 founding of the University of Sussex, designed by Sir Basil Spence. The University acquired a strong academic reputation, and a certain reputation for radicalism. Brighton, with its vibrant cultural scene, is hard to imagine without the thousands of students from Sussex and Brighton Polytechnic, which was given the name University of Brighton in 1992, but with its early roots in the Victorian-era Brighton School of Art.

Other post-war developments radically changed the centre of Brighton, in the name of creating much needed low-cost local housing. An example is the virtual replacement of Richmond Street to make way for tower blocks in the vicinity. A notable feature of this area was a fence at the junction of the present Elmore Road and Richmond Street which once stopped carts from running away down the steep hill.

In the same area of the town there have been further developments, with student accommodation at the bottom of Southover Street being built in the early 1990s near the site of the Phoenix Brewery. An adjacent housing association development at the bottom of Albion Hill, behind the Phoenix Gallery, incorporates the houses once known as "The Peoples State of Trumpton" which was first squatted by Martin and Suzie Cowley in an effort to halt the demolition of the cottages, one being the smallest cottage in Brighton, it was twinned with The Peoples State of Chigley which was a squatted area in Brigg in Lincolnshire, formerly a long-term squatted dwelling, its colourful appearance much in fitting with the area's Bohemian demographic. The Peoples State of Trumpton arose alongside the politics of the Brighton Justice? movement and the creation of a social space in a nearby squatted former courthouse.

In the 1970s, the North Laine area was threatened with demolition, but was saved after the intervention of planning officer Ken Fines.

The period of the 1970s and '80s saw much of the town becoming somewhat dilapidated. At the same time, a major investment was being made into the Brighton Marina, which encountered stiff opposition from many local people. Opposition to the way the town was being run was also voiced by the semi-anarchist newspaper Brighton Voice. The seafront, in particular, was much less developed than today. There was notorious sub-standard rental accommodation run by slum landlords. High levels of unemployment in the central districts led to a strong unemployed counter-culture involving squatting. Whilst a minority of the population, they had a strong and visible presence, often with brightly dyed hair or dreadlocks, and were overtly political, vocal in their hatred of the Margaret Thatcher government.

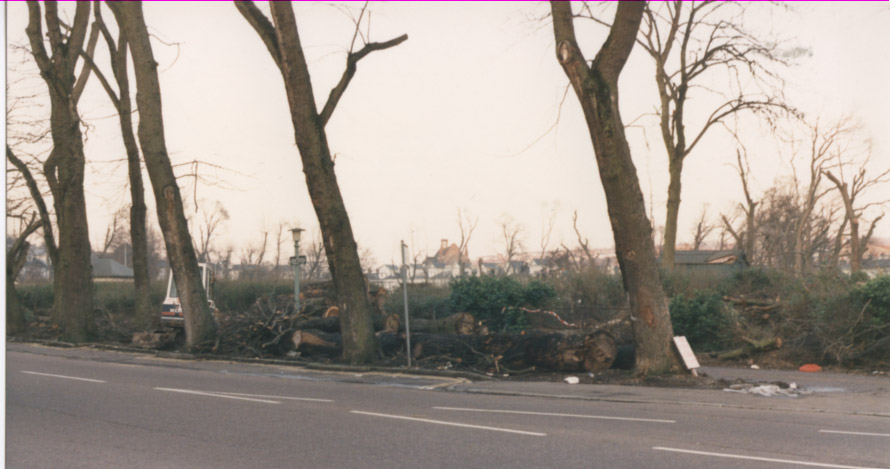
After the storm of 1987.

This period is punctuated by a natural phenomenon: the Great Storm of 1987. The Level and Steine were decimated by this event with many great elm trees lost. The Pavilion and the Church of St. Peter suffered substantial damage.

Embassy Court is one of the most unusual buildings on the seafront at Brighton and Hove, although the reasons for this have differed over the years. When built in 1935, designed by architect Wells Coates, the building contrasted sharply with the more sedate and ornamental architecture of King's Road, and was suggested as a prototype for a proposed total redevelopment. However, by the 1990s the structure drew comment because of the state of its decay. The building made the local press after chunks of render and windows fell from the building onto the street below, and it appeared until recently that it might suffer the same ignominious fate met by the nearby West Pier, which all but succumbed to the elements and suspected arsonists in early 2004. Eventually this fate was avoided: a consortium formed by residents and owners were able to wrestle the freehold of the building from the then management company, and restoration began in 2004, being completed by autumn 2005.

Provisional Irish Republican Army member Patrick Magee used a time bomb to kill 5 people and injure another 31 at the Grand Hotel on 12 October 1984.

Social change during the 20th century has seen many of the 19th century townhouses converted to flats, along with the mews buildings which once served many of them.

In 1997, Brighton's town council was superseded by Brighton and Hove (a unitary authority), granted city status by the Queen in 2001.

== Economic history ==
The mainstay of Brighton's economy for its first 700 years was fishing. Open land called the Hempshares (the site of the present Lanes) provided hemp for ropes; sails were made from flax grown in Hove; nets were dried and boats were kept on the open land which became Old Steine; and fishermen lived and worked on the foreshore below the East Cliff, in an area known as Lower Town. Herring and mackerel were sometimes used in ecclesiastical and manorial transactions, a tradition which ended in the 19th century. As Brighton grew, many fishermen moved to the Carlton Hill area and used its many warehouses and workshops to cure and smoke their catches. The industry was so important in the town's early history that in 1579 a commission of important residents, formed at the Privy Council of England's request, commanded the fishermen to document how they worked and how they divided and distributed their catches and profits. These customs were then enshrined in law. Two original copies of The Book of All The Auncient Customs heretoforeused amonge the fishermen of the Toune of Brighthelmstone [sic] survive. In 1580, the year it was published, Brighton's 80-boat, 10,000-net fleet was the largest in southern England and employed 400 men. Herring and mackerel were the main products, but plaice, cod and conger eels were also fished. By 1790 there were 100 boats, but this declined to 48 by 1948. A fish market established below King's Road in 1864, replacing the ancient open-air market on the beach, moved to Carlton Hill in 1960 but closed in 2005. The present, much smaller fleet is based at Brighton Marina.

In the 18th century the economy diversified as the town grew. Small-scale foundries were established, especially in the North Laine area; coal importers such as the Brighthelmston Coal Company set up business to receive fuel sent from Newcastle; and the rise of tourism and fashionable society was reflected in the proliferation of lodging house keepers, day and boarding school proprietors, dressmakers, milliners and jewellers. Many women worked: more than half of working women in Brighton in the late 18th century were in charge of lodging houses, and domestic service and large-scale laundries were other major employers. Brewing was another of Brighton's early specialisms. The industry started in the 17th century and took off after 1800. Major names included the Kemp Town Brewery (1840s–1964), (Note: This is not the same as the present Kemp Town Brewery, founded in 1988 and based at the Hand in Hand pub in Kemptown.) Cannon Brewery (1821–1969), Griffiths (later Rock) Brewery (1809–1960), the Albion, the Longhurst and the Bristol Steam Brewery. Many others failed to survive the 19th century. The Black Lion Brewery in The Lanes, founded by Dirick Carver in 1545, stopped brewing in 1901 but its buildings survived until 1968. The biggest brewery was Tamplins (1821–1973), which owned over 200 pubs in Brighton at one time and bought many smaller breweries such as the Smithers (1851) and West Street (1767) companies.

== Politics and activism ==
The political campaigning group Justice? and its SchNEWS newspaper were based in Brighton, at the Cowley Club libertarian social centre. This was named after Harry Cowley (1890–1971), "one of the earliest and best-loved proponents of 'people power' activism in Brighton".

== See also ==
- Timeline of Brighton
- History of Sussex

== Notes ==
- Doctor Brighton: Richard Russell and the sea water cure, Sakula A., J Med Biogr. 1995 Feb;3(1):30-3.
- Glandular Diseases, or a Dissertation on the Use of Sea Water in the Affections of the Glands, Richard Russell, 1750.
- Thoughts on Brighthelmston, concerning sea-bathing and drinking sea-water with some directions for their use,John Awsiter, 1768.
