= Zero Retention Force Arming Unit =

The Zero Retention Force Arming Unit (ZRFAU) is an electro mechanical device used on military aircraft bomb racks to arm munitions as they are released from the aircraft.

EDO MBM Technology Ltd are sole owners of the proprietary rights to the unit and act as technical support and design authority for its ongoing use and installation. The units are used in U.S. Navy BRU-32, BRU-41, BRU-42, BRU-45, the US Air Force BRU-46 & BRU-47, the Royal Australian Air Force MAU-12, the European Tornado HMERU & LMERU bomb racks.

Since at least 2012 the ZRFAU has been in operational use on the General Atomics MQ-9 Reaper drone. The MQ-9 bomb rack BRU-71/A is made by EDO MBM parent company Harris Corporation and utilises the ZRFAU as an essential part.

The ZRFAU is used in the Israeli Military Industries (IMI) VER-2 Bomb Rack, which is owned by EDO MBM Technology Ltd, and advertised for sale by a subsidiary of Elbit Systems Ltd in Israel. for the Israeli Air force F-16.

Following investigations by activists into EDO MBM's links with Israel, and the submission of documents showing these links as part of a defence of protesters, EDO MBM removed from their website a reference stating it was 'actively manufacturing' ZRFAUs, claiming this statement had been 'an error'. Directors of EDO(UK)Ltd, the holding company of EDO MBM admitted that a US subsidiary, Artisan Technologies, in New Jersey, did manufacture the component supplied to Israel. This subsidiary was 100% owned by EDO(UK)Ltd from 2000 until it was apparently sold in 2008 to its US parent company. Despite the sale of Artisan, EDO MBM continued to be the sole point of contact for sales and technical support for the component until 2012 when all references to the component were removed from the then parent ITT Exelis website.

In November 2009 the Information Tribunal looking at EDO MBM's export licence applications held by the Dept for Business (BIS) found "There was no dispute that the ERU151 and the ZRFAU are components which can be incorporated into VER-2 bomb racks for use with F-16 combat aircraft, that those aircraft are used by the Israeli air force, and that from 1998 EDO owned the right to manufacture the ERU151 and the ZRFAU.'" But "After examining the documents, it concluded the information did not confirm claims that EDO supplied Israel, and therefore the documents should remain confidential. EDO MBM's involvement with the design, development, technical support and supply of the ZRFAU had apparently been taking place without the required UK export licences.

In June 2010 in the EDO Decommissioners Case a jury acquitted seven activists of conspiracy to cause £180,000 criminal damage to the EDO MBM factory. Facing a ten-year prison sentence if convicted they admitted causing the damage, they pleaded not guilty to any crime on the grounds that their belief that EDO MBM had been supplying Israel with the ZRFAU at the time of Operation Cast Lead, and by extension that EDO MBM were complicit in war crimes carried out by Israel against the people of Gaza, was a reasonable belief. Paul Hills, the Director of EDO MBM, accepted during the trial that in light of all the documents admitted as evidence in the trial, then the activists belief was 'not unreasonable,' although as in previous sworn testimony he continued to deny it was true.
