= SchNEWS =

British weekly newspaper (1994–2014)

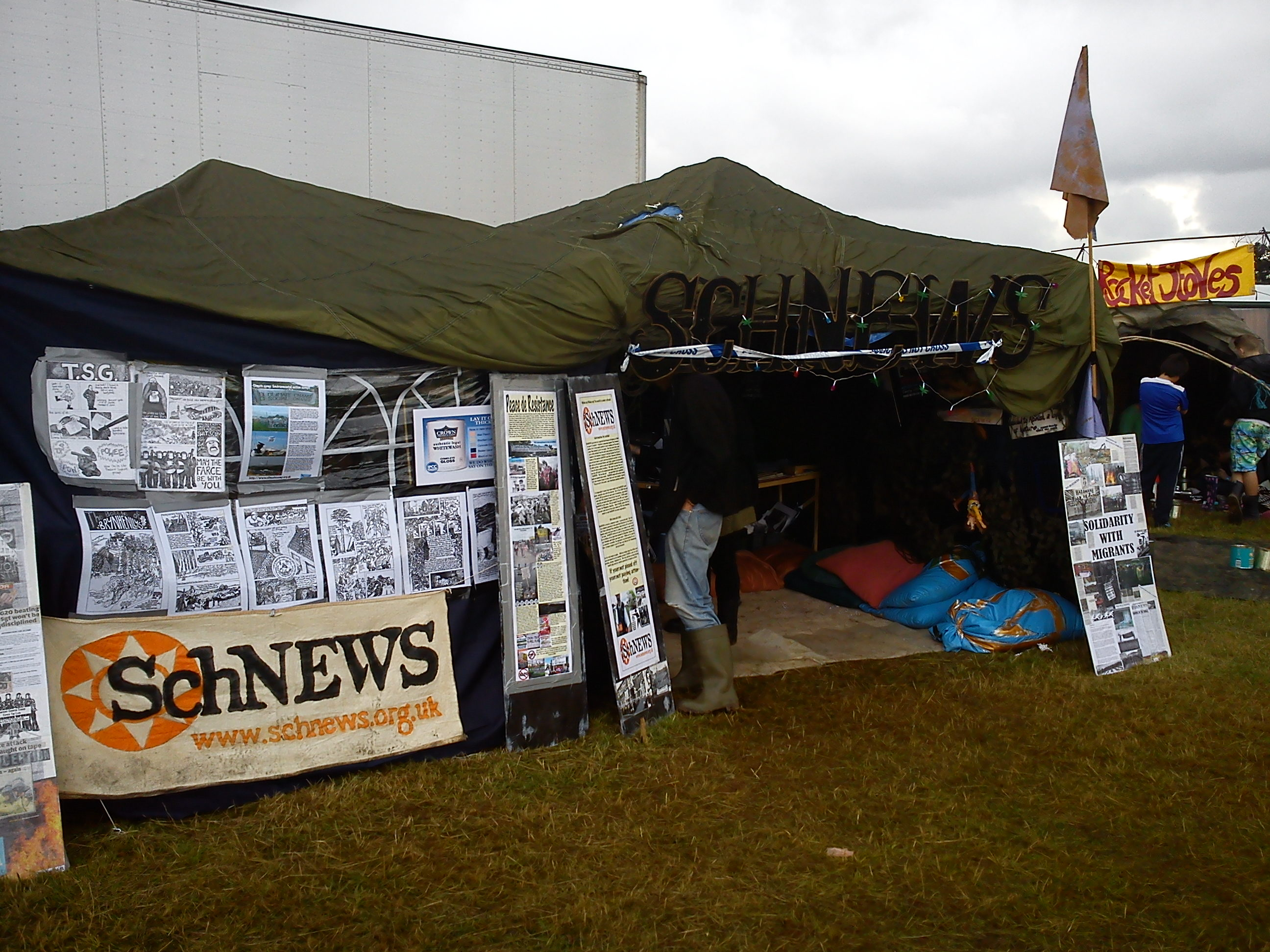
- SchNEWS stall at Boomtown Festival 2010
- Type: Protest
- Format: Weekly newsletter
- Publisher: Justice?
- Editor: Anonymous
- Founded: November 1994
- Ceased publication: September 2014
- Language: English
- Headquarters: Brighton
- Circulation: 2,000 per issue on paper, 11,000 by email
- Website: SchNEWS.org, SchNEWS at archive.org

SchNEWS was a free weekly publication from Brighton, England, which ran from November 1994 until September 2014. The main focus was environmental and social issues/struggles in the UK – but also internationally – with an emphasis on direct action protest, and autonomous political struggles outside formalised political parties.

As well as the free weekly double-sided A4 news-sheet and website, SchNEWS also regularly produced short films (called SchMOVIES), and has self-published a series of books – mostly annuals featuring compilations of SchNEWS issues. The group also produced political satire shows, the most recent being national tours in 2004 and 2005, and since its inception held free-information stalls and marquees at major UK festivals, free parties and other events.

SchNEWS was run entirely by unpaid volunteers, and existed financially by donation from readers and subscribers, rather than through regular funding channels.

The strapline and motto of SchNEWS was "information for action" – giving the reader the necessary information and contacts, so they can become pro-actively involved in political issues. It was once dubbed "the national newsletter of the protest movement" by the newspaper The Guardian.

== History ==
SchNEWS arose in 1994 in Brighton out of the then campaign against the Criminal Justice and Public Order Act 1994 called Justice?. One of the focal points of this campaign was the squatting of an old courthouse in central Brighton in September 1994, from which began live "newsreading performances", amongst other demonstrations, direct action protests, events, talks, parties. After the eviction of the courthouse, one of the newsreaders and another activist involved began a newsletter, initially meant to act as a collective memory for the groups formed under the Justice? banner. The original working name was The SchNEWSPAPER which was the form of the dummy-run version that featured the first headline "Man sits down in park". The first version of SchNEWS was a pilot issue created by David M. Berry and Gibby Zobel in Luther Street, Brighton, was published on 16 November 1994, being one side of A4. It had a very small print run and featured the headline "Big Brother CCTV installed in Brighton".

The live news reading, called SchLIVE, continued from this initial point, and once the news-sheet was running it became a performed version of it. SchLIVE was a weekly event at various venues around Brighton, culminating in a national tour in 1996.

SchNEWS quickly built up a national readership, gaining popularity for presenting its news in a concise, witty and jargon-free language. While its initial focus was resistance to the Criminal Justice Bill (CJB), it quickly moved onto other relevant social and environmental struggles in the UK and abroad, outlasting the anti-CJB cause and Justice? itself.

It went on to cover the protests against the building of the M11 motorway link road in London, the anti-Newbury bypass protests in Berkshire and the actions of Reclaim the Streets. It has also reported on labour issues such as the Liverpool Dockers' Strike of 1995–97, fights against the privatisation of public services, racism, climate change and genetic engineering. Some of those involved were also part of the Simon Jones Memorial Campaign which SchNEWS championed. Later the focus turned to more international issues such as neo-liberalism and more recently the anti-war movement.

While the final editions of SchNEWS look very similar to the initial issues – two sides of A4 crammed with text – its subject matter and readership was transformed by the rise of the internet. While its first five years saw SchNEWS as the newsletter for the British direct action movement, and mostly distributed in paper form, in 2000 it joined Indymedia and other alternative media on the internet to reach an international audience, and the content broadened accordingly. It found a niche on the internet specialising in what it originally did; that is, covering grass-roots social and environmental struggles in the UK.

SchNEWS was a non-commercial enterprise and carries no advertising, it was written and edited by a small group of volunteers. It relied on the revenue it brought in from subscriptions, benefit gigs and donations. Its office space was for eight years donated by music group The Levellers. It subsequently moved to premises within an alternative social enterprise, The Cowley Club, in central Brighton, with the rent covered by donations. Internet capacity was donated by a local non-profit collective.

Started in 2004, SchMOVIES was the film-making side of SchNEWS. SchMOVIES mostly produced short films featuring many of the same protests and issues that the newsletter did, and films are free to download. There have been two 'feature length' films – SchNEWS at Ten ...the movie (2005), and On the Verge (2008) – the Smash EDO campaign film which gained notoriety due to having its premiere screening in Brighton in March 2008 pulled due to underhand police intervention.

The website, from which the majority of readers now read SchNEWS, contains an archive of contact lists and back issues, as well as a repository for films and satirical graphics. The most well used part of the site is the Party & Protest listings, covering demonstrations, events, meetings, screenings, benefit gigs and festivals.

The team behind SchNEWS ended regular publication in September 2014.

== See also ==
- Brighton Voice – Alternative news in Brighton 1973–1989
