= On the Verge (film) =

- Release date: 17 March 2008
- Country: United Kingdom
- Language: English

On The Verge is a 90-minute independent film documentary made by SchNEWS SchMovies that was supposed to have its premiere screening at the Duke of York's Cinema, Brighton, UK, on 17 March 2008.

The film covers the history of the Smash EDO anti-war campaign in Brighton, which protested against the arms manufacturer EDO MBM Technology Ltd located in the town from 2004 to 2008. The film is critical of the Sussex Police, arguing that they colluded with the company to intimidate protesters and bolster the case for a High Court harassment injunction. This would have banned anti-war protests outside the factory, but a judge found the company had abused the legal process.

The film showing was cancelled at the last moment as a result of an intervention by Sussex Police who worked with Brighton and Hove Council to threaten the cinema with legal action if the showing went ahead. The film had not been certificated by the local authority and the council claimed it would have breached local health and safety laws if shown.

The cinema was told by the council that the police had contacted them and informed them of the breach in licensing law, but the police denied this, saying that they never get involved in issues of film certification. Later Sussex Police admitted that "a junior officer, ...not based in the city" had contacted the council about the film.

Council documents released in April 2008 under the Freedom of Information Act concealed the identity and location of the complaining police officer. Sussex Police released a single notebook entry and refused to confirm or deny the existence of other information. In March 2008 the film began a tour of venues across Britain and was dogged by similar censorious events in a number of towns and cities in what appeared to be a coordinated campaign by unknown elements in the British establishment to have the film banned.

In May 2008 SchNEWS reported that the secret Sussex police officer who had contacted Brighton council had been identified as a plain clothes Detective Constable based at Sussex Police HQ in Lewes. Lewes is also the base for Sussex Special Branch.

In May 2008 a free torrent download of the film was released on the internet by the filmmakers.

In April 2009 the film was nominated for an Index on Censorship Freedom of Expression film award.
