= Reclaim the Streets =

Advocacy group for community ownership of public spaces

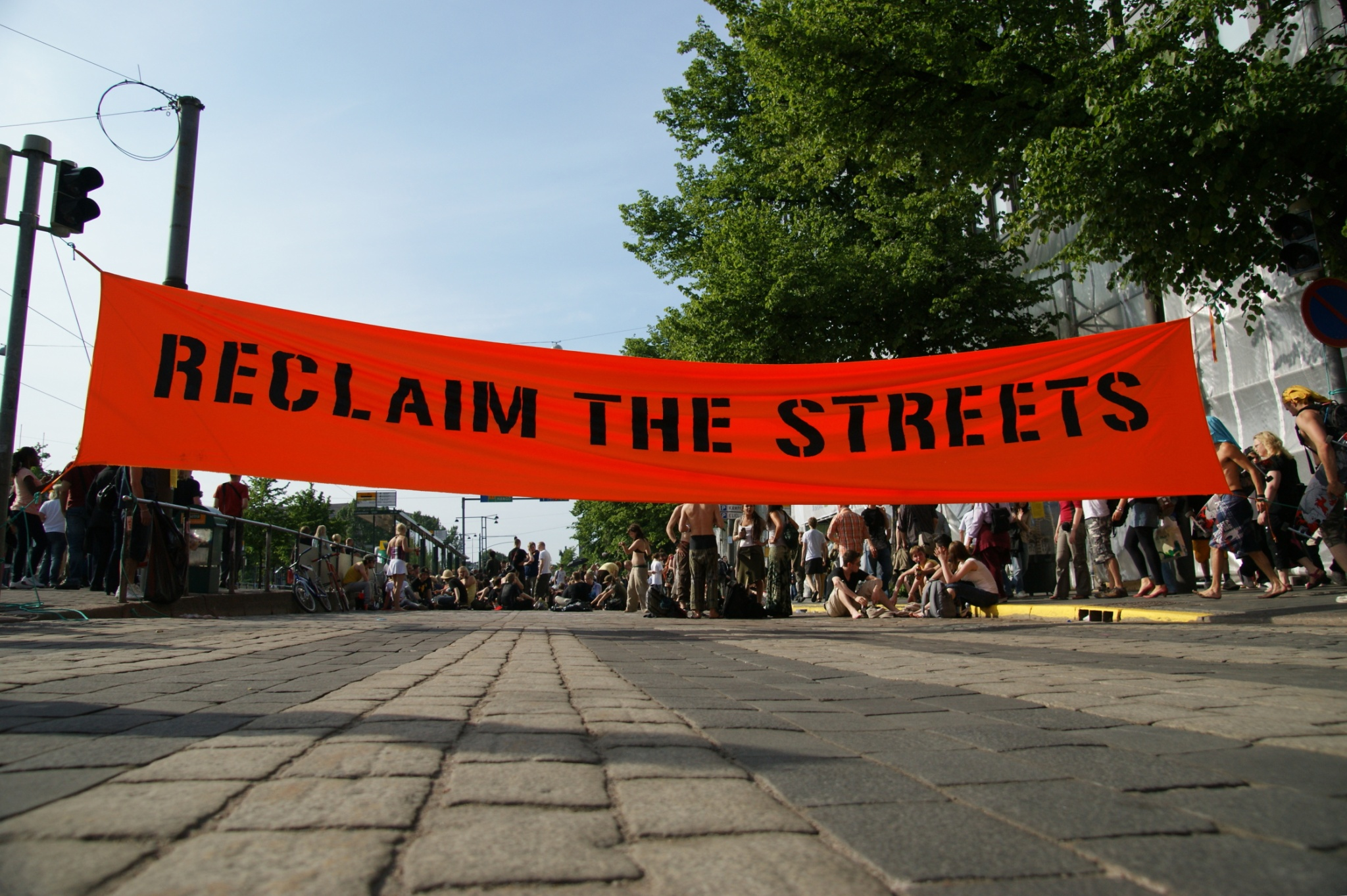
- Founded: 1995
- Founded at: London, United Kingdom
- Type: Resistance movement
- Purpose: Street reclaiming and environmentalism
- Location: Worldwide
- Method: Direct action

Reclaim the Streets, also known as RTS, are a collective with a shared ideal of community ownership of public spaces. Participants characterise the collective as a resistance movement opposed to the dominance of corporate forces in globalisation, and to the car as the dominant mode of transport.

Reclaim the Streets often stage non-violent direct action street reclaiming events such as the 'invasion' of a major road, highway or motorway to stage a party. While this may obstruct the regular users of these spaces such as car drivers and public bus riders, the philosophy of RTS is that it is vehicle traffic, not pedestrians, who are causing the obstruction, and that by occupying the road they are in fact opening up public space. The events are usually spectacular and colourful, with sand pits for children to play in, free food and music.

Reclaim the Streets, as a collective, and by extension of all events that take this name regardless of their relationship to the original collective, often engage in non-violent direct actions of reclamation, events such as "invading" a road, highway, or freeway to hold a party.

Reclaim the Streets was originally formed by Earth First!

== Past actions ==
=== UK ===
- Camden High Street, 14 May 1995. The first major RTS street party action took over a busy London street and closed it to motor-traffic for an afternoon. Around 500 people took over the street. There was free food served from tables in the middle of the road, and music played from a bicycle-powered sound system. A climbing frame was placed in the middle of a crossroad junction and children were able to play on it. The action met on the high street in the afternoon and left from the Rainbow Centre, a squatted Church in Kentish Town.
- Upper Street, Islington, 23 July 1995. Three thousand people party at another busy traffic junction. Banners are stretched between lampposts, with messages such as ‘STREET NOW OPEN’ and ‘CAR FREE’. There is a sound system as well as a live band that uses a bus stop as a stage. Kids play in a hastily constructed sandpit.
- Birmingham, 6 August 1995. Organised with a handful of people around 200 people turn up for family afternoon with live band playing from the back of a truck. To prevent police using riot tactics to clear the street at the end, a procession with music and dancing headed off down the road to a pub.
- Brighton, 14 February 1996. Protest publicised in part by Justice? & SchNEWS closes a section of the North Laine area of Brighton. A bouncy castle is erected in a crossing and traffic is stopped for most of the afternoon.
- M41 Motorway, Shepherd's Bush, London. 13 July 1996. After a cat-and-mouse game with the police, 6,000 protestors take over part of the elevated motorway. Many sound-systems play, one of which is carried on a truck that was parked on the hard shoulder. Hidden underneath dancers walking on stilts and wearing huge, wire-supported dresses, environmental activists drill holes in the tarmac and plant trees. The party continued into the next morning.
- Pershore Road, Birmingham, 17 August 1996
- Mill Road, Cambridge, Saturday 14 September 1996
- Reclaim the Future, Liverpool, Saturday 28 September 1996
- Cowley Road, Oxford Thursday 31 October 1996 - Afternoon and evening party which began when sound systems on lorries stopped traffic using Cowley Road between around Divinity Road and Rectory Road
- Trafalgar Square, 12 April 1997. The 'Never Mind The Ballots' protest against the forthcoming general election. A march with the sacked Liverpool dockers started at Kennington Park and ended up at Trafalgar Square in the centre of London.
- Brixton Road, Brixton and High Road, Seven Sisters, 6 June 1998. Two street reclamations in one day, with an estimated 5,000 people at each party.
- Grassmarket, Edinburgh, 11 August 1997
- Bank Underground station, London, 13 July 1998. To show support for London Underground workers striking resisting privatisation, activists shut down the Central line by climbing on a train in the morning rush-hour and unfurled a larger banner at the station entrance.
- Global Street Party! Birmingham Bullring, 16th May 1998
- Toxic Planet at 173 Upper Street, London (opposite Islington Town Hall), 4–11 October 1998.
- Tube party, 1 May 1999.
- Carnival Against Capital: 18 June 1999. A global day of action. In London the financial district is targeted. The LIFFE building is stormed.
- Seattle Solidarity Action, Euston Station, London. 30 November 1999. The World Trade Organization was meeting in Seattle and met with concerted protest.
- No Blood For Oil. 3 February 2000. A solidarity action in support of the U'wa people of Colombia.
- Guerilla Gardening. 1 May 2000. An expressly non-violent gardening action at Parliament Square.
- Action to mark the introduction of the Terrorism Act. 19 February 2001.
- Bye Bye Planet. 19 April 2001. An action at the Natural History Museum protested at the perceived greenwash and corporate rebranding of BP by subverting an exhibition about climate change which was sponsored by BP.
- Business Class Tube launched. 5 June 2001. 50 trains receive stickers announcing a new Cattle Class.
- Free shop at a May Day event. 1 May 2002
- Reclaim the Future. 11–22 September 2002.
- Street party against arms trade. 10 September 2003.

=== Worldwide ===
- February 1998 Sydney.
- April 1998 Amsterdam.
- April 1998 Bielefeld, Germany.
- May 1998 Global Street Party!; Arcata, California; Berkeley, California; Athens, Greece; Birmingham and York, England; Bogotá, Colombia; Brisbane, Melbourne and Darwin, Australia; Dresden and Berlin, Germany; Geneva, Switzerland; Ljubljana, Slovenia; Lyon, France; Prague, Czech Republic; Stockholm, Sweden; Tallinn, Estonia; Tel Aviv, Israel; Toronto, Canada; Turku, Finland; Utrecht, Netherlands; Valencia, Spain; Vancouver, Canada.
- July 1998 Helsinki.
- August 1998 Jyväskylä.
- September 1998 Berlin.
- October 1998 Broadway, New York City.
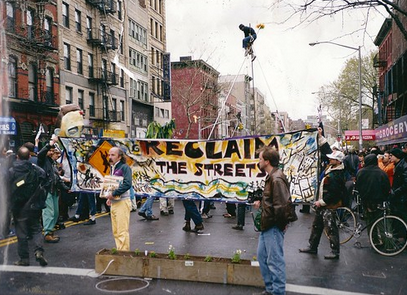
- New York City event in 1999
  April 1999 New York City: Avenue A. Reclaim the Streets and Turn them into Gardens.
- April 1999 Berlin.
- May 1999 Turku, Finland; late May 1999 Brussels, Belgium.
- June 1999 Global carnival against capital; London; Scotland; Nigeria; Czech Republic; Los Angeles; (Germany); Australia; Barcelona in 18 June; New York City.
- July 1999 Tampere, Finland.
- July 1999 Helsinki.
- September 1999 Berlin.
- September 1999 Stockholm.
- All over the place: N30; Seattle, WA/USA: N30 and today's Seattle Indymedia; London (and commentary; Geneva, Switzerland 16 and 27 Nov; New Delhi; Manila, Philippines 24 Nov; Athens; New York City 26 Nov; Padua, Italy 27 Nov; Milan, Italy 27 Nov; presque toute la France; Brisbane, Australia; Cardiff & Bangor, Wales; Halifax, England; Leeds, England; Manchester, England; Totnes, England; Iceland; Narmada, India; Bangalore, India; Schiphol/Amsterdam, Netherlands; Berlin, Germany; Rome, Italy; Long Beach, CA/USA; Baltimore, MD/USA; Tel Aviv, Israel; Nashville, TN/USA; Washington DC/USA.
- 9 March 2000 Barcelona, Spain.
- 1 May 2000 Beverly Hills, California, USA.
- May 2000 Helsinki.
- May 2000 Turku, Finland.
- July 2000 Joensuu, Finland.
- September 2000 Naperville, Illinois.
- September 2000 Brussels.
- September 2000 Prague: S26 at the World Bank / International Monetary Fund.
- November 2000 Den Haag, Netherlands: Rising Tide (etc.) protests at the UN climate talks.
- December 2000 Nice: European Summit (indymedia reports: more a joined-up-Europe than a UK thang?).
- January 2001 Davos: World Economic Forum demonstrations.
- 24 Feb – 12 March 2001 Chiapas – Mexico City: the Zapatour.
- March 2001 Adelaide, Australia.
- April 2001 Quebec City: Anti-capitalist Carnival, welcoming in the spring (and shaking down the Free Trade-touting "Americas Summit"): www.quebec2001.net
- April 2001 Everywhere (mostly Nordic) Operation Dessert Storm.
- May 2001 All over – MayDay. RTS in crèche shock! statement; and see indymedia.
- May 2001 Thessaloniki, Greece.
- May 2001 Helsinki.
- May 2001 Prague.
- May 2001 Asheville, North Carolina.
- June 2001 Brno, Czech Republic.
- June 2001 Bratislava, Slovakia.
- July 2001 Bonn, Germany at climate conference.
- July 2001 Naperville, Illinois.
- August 2001 Turku, Finland.
- August 2001 Seattle.
- September 2001 Leuven, Belgium.
- September 2001 Cochabamba, Bolivia: PGA gathering.
- 25 September 2001 Cochabamba, Bolivia Magical Mystery tour.
- October 2001 Ghent, Belgium.
- November 2001 widespread actions coinciding with the World Trade Organization Doha Declaration.
- December 2001 Sydney.
- December 2001 Brussels.
- March 2002 Summit of the European Council Barcelona.
- March 2002 Active Fair (street party) Sydney.
- April 2002 Seattle Street Party.
- April 2002 Gap, France.
- April 2002 Paris.
- May 2002 Dublin
- May 2002 Lahti, Finland.
- May 2002 Liège, Belgium.
- May 2002 Lyon, France.
- July 2002 Helsinki.
- August 2002 Zürich.
- May 2003 Dublin
- Sept 2003 Melbourne.
- Sept 2003 Brisbane, Canberra & Sydney.
- Sept 2003 Wellington, New Zealand.
- May 2004 Dublin. Part of a 'No Borders' weekend of protest, which led to some violence
- April 2006, Sydney. Gathering at the financially troubled Cross City Tunnel, attendees called for greater investment in public transport and cycle paths, with partygoers occupying the tarmac and enjoying performances by the ShittyRail Transit Cop dance troupe.
- December 2006 – Protest against demolition of the 1957 Star Ferry Pier, Central, Hong Kong.
- May 2007 – Protest against demolition of the 1953 Queen's Pier, Central, Hong Kong.
- Mar – Apr 2008 – Performance art competition against the privatisation of public area in front of Times Square (Hong Kong), Causeway Bay, Hong Kong.
- Apr 2008 Amsterdam – protest for free space and a performance from a truck driving through the streets of Amsterdam.
- 31 May 2008 San Francisco – Street party against Prop 98.
- 1 September 2008 Limoilou, Quebec, Canada.
- 19 September 2008, Malmö, Sweden.
- 16 June 2009, Helsinki, Finland.
- 6 February 2010, Zürich.
- August 2011, Jyväskylä, Finland.
- 7 August 2011, Helsinki, Finland.
- 10 June 2012, Brussels, Belgium. 3,000 people participated in a disobedient Pic Nic to Reclaim The Streets.
- 6 September 2014, Sydney, Australia.
- November 2014, India (Delhi, Mumbai) Raahgiri (Our Streets, Our Freedom) Sponsored by various media partners.
- 13 December 2014, Sydney, Australia – Against the Westconnex Motorway.
- 1 February 2015, Sydney, Australia – King Street Crawl Against the Westconnex Motorway.
- 13 September 2015, Sydney, Australia – 99 Reasons To Dance.
- 12 December 2015, Sydney, Australia – A Liveable City For All.
- 19 March 2016, Sydney, Australia – Against The Star Casino.
- 23 April 2016, Sydney, Australia – Keep Newtown Weird and Safe.
- 18 June 2016, Sydney, Australia – Broke But Not Broken.
- 2 October 2016, Sydney, Australia – Save Sydney Park.
- 19 March 2017, Sydney, Australia – Keep Newtown Weird and Safe.
- 23 September 2017, Sydney, Australia – Signed Sealed Delivered.
- 15 November 2017, Sydney, Australia – Love Triumphant.
- 22 April 2018, Sydney, Australia - Keep Newtown Weird and Safe.
- 19 January 2019, Sydney, Australia - Demand Action: Pill Testing Saves Lives.
- 23 November 2019, Sydney, Australia - Dance In Defiance: Street Party for Pill Testing!

== See also ==
- Anti-corporate activism
- Car-free movement
- Carfree city
- Carnival Against Capital
- Critical Mass (cycling)
- Cyclability
- Cycling infrastructure
- Green infrastructure
- Living street – Traffic calming in spaces shared between road users
- Living Streets (UK) – UK charity for everyday walking
- M11 link road protest
- New Urbanism
- Pedestrian village
- SchNEWS
- Stop the City – 1983-4 UK demonstrations against the military-financial complex
- Time's Up! – Environmental organization in New York, United States
- Walkability
- Walking audit
- Walking city
