= EDO MBM Technology Ltd v Campaign to Smash EDO =

Civil legal action against anti-war protesters

EDO MBM v. Smash EDO and others
- Court: Queen's Bench

Case history
- Prior action: None
- Subsequent action: R v Saibene and Others

EDO MBM Technology Ltd v Campaign to Smash EDO and Others ([2005] EWHC 837 (QB)) was a High Court of Justice civil action brought by EDO MBM Technology Ltd, a subsidiary of EDO Corporation, against protesters in Brighton, that began in April 2005 and was settled by March 2006.

It changed name to EDO Technology Limited ("EDO") and David Anthony Jones v Campaign to Smash EDO and Others ([2005] EWHC 2490 (QB)) to join the managing director and employees of the company as claimants. Two of the defendants, unincorporated associations "Smash EDO" and "Bombs Out of Brighton Campaign", were struck out in April 2005 because they were unrepresented.

== Introduction ==
An anti-war protest campaign against EDO MBM Technology Ltd ("EDO") began in Brighton in 2004 as a direct result of press articles confirming the company was making parts for then new Paveway IV guided bomb to be used in the Iraq War. The ongoing protests led EDO, in April 2005, to seek a permanent high court injunction against 14 named protesters and two protest groups, Smash EDO and Bombs out Of Brighton, on grounds of harassment. The intended injunction, brought under Section 3 of the Protection from Harassment Act 1997, applied to all protesters, not only those named in the court papers (who in any case denied the allegations). Breach of any condition of the civil injunction carried a criminal penalty of up to five years in prison.

== Preliminary issues trial ==
The High Court proceedings at the Royal Courts of Justice, opened a legal argument to the defendants of 'preventing war crimes', allowing them to put forward evidence of EDO's complicity in war crimes, and refer to the International Criminal Court Act 2001. This legal defence was taken seriously by the court. It had been dismissed in lower courts in Brighton as beyond their jurisdiction.

While a defence that protesters could have been justified in harassing employees of the company to stop a war crime being committed was rejected by the court in a preliminary issues trial of November 2005, on the grounds that such crimes could not be prevented over a long term, but only in immediate actions to stop imminent and specific crimes, the court accepted that a further defense argument should be open. This was that if the protesters could show they were acting reasonably in the circumstances on the basis of an objective evidential test, then there was a defence that any harassment, if it had taken place, could be lawful.

The defendants collated a dossier of evidence that outlined alleged links between EDO and war crimes. This included statements given by witnesses and bombing victims from Palestine. It also included reports from journalists and human rights groups of possible war crimes in both Iraq and Palestine. The judge praised the detailed document as 'admirable'. The document detailed incidents of war crimes related to air strikes on civilian areas and infrastructure and argued that the attack and invasion of Iraq in March 2003 was in itself illegal as a war of aggression in contravention of the UN Charter.

== Attorney General's intervention in the case ==
The barrister David Perry was instructed by the UK Attorney-General to defend the legality of the war on Iraq, and apparently support EDO's case for the injunction. Perry described the protests and non-violent direct actions (NVDA) in Brighton as 'a mask for anarchy' and suggested that the protesters belief that EDO were complicit in war crimes was imaginary and even dangerous. The written submissions of the AG to the High Court supported EDO's claim that the arms company did not supply Israel with military equipment. Later in a Freedom of Information response in 2006 the Attorney General's Office admitted that Perry had simply taken the word of the company on this issue and assumed it to be true even though he had not verified it.

Despite this intervention, the court did not accept the AG's argument that taking into account an honestly held belief by protesters that war crimes had taken place assisted by EDO, was wrong. The court found that if there was an imminent war crime that the protesters believed on reasonable grounds, was about to take place, in which EDO were complicit, then preventative direct action could lawfully be taken against the company without waiting for the authorities of the state to intervene. This ruling effectively allowed proportionate direct action against companies by protesters, if the threat of the crime was imminent and specific.

"It was not necessary to show that any crime was actually committed, merely that the course of conduct had been pursued to prevent the commission of crime. Further, it need not be proved that the person to whom the conduct was directed was the person who was about to commit the crime. The word 'prevent' in the provision did not, however, extend to any long term prevention of crime."

On the news of this judgment EDO Corporation's share price dropped dramatically on Wall Street in the following days.

The High Court also rejected EDO's claim that even though there may well have been war crimes carried out with its products, the company was protected from prosecution as a supplier to the military by the royal prerogative which disallows the domestic courts from making judgments of government foreign policy. In response to this the judge went so far as to compare the director of EDO to Bruno Tesch (Chemist) of the Zyclon B case, who was executed for assisting the genocidal policies of the Nazi regime in Germany in the 1940s.

== Settlement of the case ==
In February 2006 in an out of court settlement, several defendants who had been represented by lawyers funded by Legal Aid agreed that they would sign undertakings not to do certain things that they had never done and had no intention of doing, on condition of discontinuance, that defendants costs of the case were paid by EDO. EDO also had to pay their own substantial costs. The injunction against all other protesters other than those in court was also to be lifted.

This settlement effectively ended the blanket injunction against all protests at the EDO MBM factory in Brighton. The represented defendants had no choice but to sign the undertaking because Legal Aid had become dependent on the offer of such a document to EDO, as a result of the intervention of Keir Starmer QC supposedly on the behalf of the defence. Starmer made the recommendation of such a settlement to the Legal Services Commission who then made it a condition of continued funding of the defence case. Legal funding would thus have been withdrawn from the represented defendants if they had not signed the undertakings.

The legal action continued against three remaining defendants who as litigants in person were not dependent of Legal Aid so were able to refuse the written undertakings demand (and large lump sums offered by EDO to sign them). EDO had hoped that these remaining defendants would follow the lead of the lawyers, so that the company would not suffer the exposure of an abuse of process hearing against them that had been a major factor in the out of court settlement for the other defendants.

EDO's legal team dropped the whole case before the trial started, after a damning judgment in March 2006, where a judge agreed with the remaining defendants, that the company had failed to prepare for what had been ordered by the court to be a speedy trial. An earlier judge had already decided the interim injunction created serious infringements of protester's ECHR human rights to expression and association. EDO agreed to pay the full costs to remaining defendants and discontinued the case against all remaining invisible defendants who had not even come forward after the summons had been issued against them.

== Legal costs for EDO ==
As a result of the collapse of the year-long court battle, EDO suffered legal costs of between £1-£1.5 million; more than an entire year's profit for the Brighton arms company. Their legal team, from the firm Lawson-Cruttenden & Co, were found by the judge to have abused the legal process by delaying the full trial, and had thereby held onto a temporary injunction with criminal penalties of up to five years in prison for breach of conditions that included, stepping into a road, playing music, and taking photographs.

== Spycops ==
In 2011 it was revealed that an undercover police officer from the National Public Order Intelligence Unit (NPOIU) using the covername 'Marco Jacobs' had spied on meetings of the defendants during the injunction case in 2005/6. This raised concerns that he had been passing sensitive and personal information to Special Branch, who at the same time were assisting EDO in bringing their injunction against anti-war protesters.

Smash EDO was given Core Participant status in the Undercover Policing Inquiry in late 2015 after an application was made to the inquiry to investigate collusion between EDO, the police and the security services MI5 in seeking to criminalise anti-war protests in Brighton.

== See also ==
- R v Saibene and Others – Trial pertaining to a direct action against the EDO MBM factory in Brighton.
- Palestine Action – Direct action group which primarily targets Israel related arms manufacturing.
