= Simon Jones Memorial Campaign =

Labor safety movement

The Simon Jones Memorial Campaign was set up after casual dock worker Simon Jones was decapitated in an industrial accident on 24 April 1998. He was working for Euromin on the south coast of England. The campaign argues that failure to train Simon for a dangerous job was tantamount to murder and that the pursuit of profit was put ahead of life. Simon died on his first day at work and was known to have no experience.

The campaign, supported by anti-casualisation campaigners from the trade unions, initially took its fight to Euromin and the employment agency who offered him the work, Personnel Selection. It has been characterised by direct action: six months after Simon's death there was an occupation of his workplace and frequent pickets of the employment agency have taken place. When the Health and Safety Executive refused to take up the issue, protestors blockaded the road for three hours. The incident was taken up by Members of Parliament and a minister acknowledged that the government plans for protecting workers were "not enough".

The Crown Prosecution Service decision to not prosecute Euromin was overturned on 23 March 2000 by a judicial review, the first time a judicial review has ever insisted on prosecuting corporate manslaughter. Euromin were ultimately fined £50,000 for breach of safety regulations. The manager was acquitted of manslaughter by a majority decision of the jury.

The anti-casualisation element of the campaign persists with the slogan "casualisation kills", the purple stickers can be seen around various casual employers or agencies. The campaigners do workshops on their methods and support others who have been affected by deaths in the workplace.
