= Justice? =

1990s British direct action group

Justice? was a 1990s direct action group, based in Brighton, England. It campaigned against the Criminal Justice and Public Order Act 1994 and set up SchNEWS.

== Courthouse ==
In 1994, the Justice? organisation held a number of meetings and debates in their squatted building (a former courthouse). Justice? was a deliberately loosely co-ordinated organisation formed around a community of people with differing and sometimes substantially conflicting political positions. Some of its more overt political actions were authored by the groups' collective persona Jo Makepeace. It campaigned against a bill in the British Parliament which was later to become the Criminal Justice and Public Order Act 1994.

== Squatters Estate Agency ==
Justice? received mainstream media attention in 1996 (including coverage on the BBC Newsnight program) when they launched their "Squatters Estate Agency."

The group also organised two direct action conferences and ran a community allotment in Moulsecoomb.

== SchNEWS ==
SchNEWS, the newsletter of the organisation, was founded at the Courthouse and read out at places in Brighton including the New Kensington pub. It continued until September 2014.

== See also ==
- DIY culture
- Punk ideologies
- Reclaim the Streets
- M11 link road protest
