= R v Saibene =

Trial of pro-Palestinian peace activists

R v Saibene and Others
- Court: Lewes Crown Court, sitting at Hove
- Decided: 30 June 2010 and 2 July
- Citation: No Law Reports

Case history
- Prior action: EDO MBM Technology Ltd v Campaign to Smash EDO

Court membership
- Judge sitting: HHJ George Bathurst-Norman

Keywords
- targeted criminal damage; popular anti-war protest; whether lawful excuse

R v Saibene and others was an English trial of seven of the "Smash EDO" campaign. On 16–17 January 2009 the activists broke into the armaments factory-office in Moulsecoomb and damaged equipment worth around £200,000. They were cleared by the jury of conspiring to cause and causing criminal damage. The jury accepted their defence that they were acting with lawful excuse by aiming to prevent Israeli war crimes during the 2009 Gaza War.

== Background ==
EDO MBM Technology Ltd is a unit of ITT Integrated Structures, once owned by EDO Corporation. It has an armaments factory-office in Moulsecoomb, Brighton and Hove.

Many actions since 2004 implored that the corporation should close or convert its factory to civilian use (road blockades, rooftop occupations, attempted weapons inspections, marches through the city centre of hundreds of protesters and three peace camps set up in woodland adjunct). Thereby arrests were made by Sussex Police, mostly under public order Acts. The campaign settled into the name "(the) Smash EDO Campaign".

The Rome Statute of the International Criminal Court brought into British domestic law by the ICC Act, makes it an offence for British citizens and residents to act in complicity in war crimes that take place anywhere in the world. In nearly all criminal trials, protesters against the company have argued that the company acts unlawfully by assisting war crimes committed in Iraq and the Israeli forces in the West Bank and Gaza. Magistrates in Brighton have generally refused to acknowledge the argument, but demonstrators have frequently been acquitted.

In March 2008 a documentary, On the Verge, about the campaign was released.

== Break-in at EDO MBM Technology ==
On 17 January 2009 activists Elijah Smith, 42, Robert Nicholls, 52, Tom Woodhead, 25, Harvey Tadman, 44, Ornella Saibene, 50, all from Bristol, raided the factory in Moulsecoomb, who pre-recorded their motivation in a video. Computers and filing cabinets were thrown out of windows and per the police assessment, "extensive damage was caused". Smash EDO said that they had performed a "citizen's decommissioning" of the factory in response to the ongoing conflict in Gaza. After these acts the activists lay down on the floor and waited to be arrested. After arrests, the motivations were posted on the Indymedia website. The total damage caused was later estimated at £180,000 (US$275,000). Police arrested people outside the factory including Christopher Osmond, 29, and Simon Levin, 35 of Brighton (joined as co-defendants).

== Trial ==
On 17 May 2010, the trial began at Hove Crown Court of the seven activists for conspiring to cause criminal damage; the maximal sentence (for guilt) being five years. They admitted they had sabotaged the factory – their defence team argued the damage was legally justified if it occurs while trying to prevent greater damage to other properties – in this case, homes in Gaza. The lawful excuse defence was invoked, according to which it can be lawful to commit an offence to prevent a more serious crime. Caroline Lucas, the MP for Brighton and the leader of the Green Party of England and Wales, supported the activists and said that this was a case in which she considered non-violent direct action legitimate.

Stephen Shay, prosecuting, argued that the factory was so small that even if it had been supplying Israel, it would have made no difference to the war in Gaza. EDO managing director Paul Hills denied in court that the company supplied components to Israel but said it did make parts for F-16 fighter planes. Judge George Bathurst-Norman said that, despite his denials, it was clear that there was enough evidence to the contrary and that the certificates required for arms export licenses were "not worth the paper they are written on," as they can be easily manipulated.

=== Summing-up ===
In his summing-up jury instructions, the judge suggested "you may well think that hell on earth would not be an understatement of what the Gazans suffered in that time". He highlighted the testimony by Caroline Lucas, MP (Grn) for a Brighton seat that "all democratic paths had been exhausted" before the activists embarked on their action.

He described the British and US governments as doing "nothing", however excluding that train of thought from relevance, telling jurors: "You must put aside any feelings of being thoroughly ashamed of our government, of the American government and the United Nations and the EU in doing nothing about what was happening."

=== Verdicts ===
Five of the activists were found not guilty by the jury on 30 June. The remaining two, Osmond and Smith, were acquitted (by jury) two days later.

== Reaction ==
The judge's comments were criticised by Israeli ambassador Ron Prosor who said: "This is not a great era for the British justice system. I assume that Sderot's children, who have lived under thousands of missiles for years, will be able to enlighten the judge as to the meaning of 'hell on earth.'" A statement form the Board of Deputies said: "The acquittal was clearly a result of the skewed narrative around Cast Lead, the judge's comments and the appearance of the local MP, who is known for her anti-Israel bias." The Zionist Federation released a statement calling for the government to censure Judge Bathurst-Norman.

The defendants' solicitor said: "We're delighted at the result. I think it sends a clear indication that sometimes direct action is the only option when all other avenues have failed."

"We made our case very clear and 12 normal people from Sussex heard that case and agreed unanimously that we'd done nothing wrong. We did £200,000 of damage and we've never denied that. We did what we believed was necessary and the jury agreed."

— Tom Woodhead, co-defendant

"We're very happy that a jury of ordinary people confronted with the facts recognised that our actions were justified... Presented with the facts of what was going on in Palestine they have backed our action. It's a victory for the anti-war movement in this country, for justice and for both British and Palestinian people."

— Ornella Saibene, co-defendant

On 15 July 2010 the Jewish Chronicle published a full transcript of the judge's final summing up of the evidence, and reported that the Zionist Federation were calling for a mistrial. Jonathan Hoffman, vice-chair of the latter, argued that "Judge Bathurst-Norman behaved more like the defence counsel than the neutral officer of the court that he was supposed to be...[his] comments reveal that he has an extreme anti-Israel agenda."

British journalist and social commentator Robin Shepherd called the case an "extraordinary moment in modern British legal history".

Regular Spectator columnist, Melanie Phillips sharply criticized the judge and suggested his politics and bias were factors in his statements to the jury.

In late July 2010, the Office for Judicial Complaints (OJC) began an investigation into the conduct. On 7 October he was formally reprimanded by the OJC, which stated that "An investigation found that a number of [his] observations did not arise directly from the evidence at trial and could be seen as an expression of the judge’s personal views on a political question. This was an error."

The judge declined any comment on the matter.

In response to this, the Smash EDO Campaign stated, "Judge George Bathurst-Norman has become subject of a concerted campaign of smears and defamation by a number of right-wing columnists, the Zionist Federation, and the Board of Deputies of British Jews on grounds that his summary of the evidence was 'anti-semitic' ... the charges of anti-semitism, which have been made against [him], are a grossly cynical attempt to undermine the significance of these acquittals of pro-Palestinian activists on evidence of Israeli war crimes. This evidence was not challenged by the Crown Prosecution Service. There is nothing anti-semitic in putting agreed evidence of Israeli war crimes to a jury."

== See also ==
- EDO MBM Technology Ltd v Campaign to Smash EDO and Others – Civil legal action against anti-war protesters
- Palestine Action – British direct action group
- Unity of Fields – Pro-Palestinian protest network
