= EDO Corporation =

American manufacturing company (1947–2007)

- Type: Public (NYSE:EDO)
- Predecessor: Edo Aircraft Corporation
- Founded: 1947
- Defunct: 2007
- Fate: Acquired by Harris Corporation
- Successor: Harris Corporation
- Headquarters: New York, NY
- Key people: James M. Smith; Chairman, President & CEO
- Revenue: ▲$715 million USD (2006)
- Number of employees: 4,000
- Website: www.harris.com

EDO Corporation was an American company which was acquired by ITT Corporation in 2007. EDO designed and manufactured products for defense, intelligence, and commercial markets, and provided related engineering and professional services. It employed 4,000 people worldwide and had revenues of $715 million in 2006. EDO's assets went to ITT Defense Electronics and Services. As of May 2015, these assets were part of Harris Corporation, and since June 2019, L3Harris Technologies.

== History ==
Earl Dodge Osborn founded the Edo Aircraft Corporation in 1925. The company's first successful product line was pontoons for floatplanes. With the outbreak of World War II, the company's focus shifted, and EDO began to provide subassemblies for military aircraft. This shift in emphasis led to the company being renamed the EDO Corporation in November 1947.

EDO became a public company in 1956 with its listing on the American Stock Exchange, and moved to the New York Stock Exchange in 1983. An agreement was reached September 18, 2007 for ITT Corporation to buy EDO for $1.7 billion. After EDO shareholders' approval, the deal was closed and finalized on December 20, 2007.

On January 12, 2011, the ITT Corporation Board of Directors approved a plan to split the company. On October 31, 2011, ITT Corporation spun off its defense and water technology businesses to form three separate, publicly traded companies. Exelis, Inc. was the spin-off that contained EDO as a subsidiary. On May 29, 2015, Harris Corp. announced the acquisition of Exelis, Inc. EDO remains a subsidiary; however, the owner has changed.

== Company structure ==
EDO's resources were aligned into two reporting segments, Electronic Systems & Communications and Engineered Systems & Services, serving six market sectors:

=== C4 (Command, Control, Communications, and Computers) ===
The Command, Control, Communications, and Computers (C4) sector includes two business units: the Antenna Products & Technologies and the Communications & Networking Systems.

EDO's antenna business custom designs antennas for military platforms and satellites. This includes military airborne, military shipboard, military ground, commercial wireless, commercial aviation, and advanced technology integrated/custom antennas.

The Communications & Networking Systems business unit designs and integrates voice and data communications equipment into end-to-end network solutions.

In 1992, EDO Corporation purchased Antenna Manufacturer Dorne & Margolin.

=== Electronic Warfare ===
The Electronic Warfare sector includes three business units: Communications and Countermeasures Systems, Defense Systems, and Reconnaissance and Surveillance Systems.

The Communications and Countermeasures Systems (CCS) business unit develops electronic protection technology. Products developed by CCS include the Shortstop Electronic Protection System (SEPS) for both military and civilian applications, the Data Link Validation System (DLVS) for validating and testing military data links, and the Wideband Secure Voice Equipment (WSVE) for secure voice radio transmission.

The Defense Systems business unit designs and manufactures high-performance electronic assemblies for military and space applications, and develops and produces electromechanical systems and equipment for government and commercial marine and aircraft applications. The primary product areas include electronic warfare systems, radar systems, embedded systems, RF/Microwave products, air quality monitoring, nuclear detection, and manufacturing services.

The Reconnaissance and Surveillance Systems business unit designs and manufactures Electronic Warfare (EW) and Signal Intelligence (SIGINT) systems and products. It manufactures integrated systems, antennas, receivers, digitizers, signal processors, and signal analysis software packages for ELINT, ESM, ECM, and SIGINT applications.

=== Integrated Systems and Structures ===
The Integrated Systems and Structures sector includes six business units: Defense Systems, EDO (UK) Ltd., Fiber Innovations, Fiber Science, MTech & Artisan, and Specialty Plastics.

The Defense Systems business unit is a designer and manufacturer of electronic assemblies for military and space applications, and the development and production of electromechanical systems and equipment for government and commercial marine and aircraft applications. The area of interest that falls within this sector includes the Aircraft and Armament Systems unit.

EDO (UK) Ltd includes EDO MBM Technology Ltd in Brighton UK, and designs, develops and manufactures weapon interfacing (carriage and release) systems, cable assemblies and electrodynamic products for the aerospace and defense industries. The UK firm makes the EDO MBM Zero Retention Force Arming Unit.

The Fiber Innovations business unit develops and manufactures composite structures for the aerospace, defense and commercial industries. This includes net shaped preform assemblies using braiding and woven fabrics, resin transfer molding (RTM) and vacuum assisted resin transfer molding (VaRTM). Fiber Science designs and manufactures lightweight advanced fiber-reinforced composite products. This includes designing and producing composite structures using the latest in filament winding, laminating, resin-transfer-molding (RTM), and autoclave cure processing.

The MTech product line consists of controller electronics for MIL-STD-1760 multiple carriage weapon suspension and release equipment, controller electronics for other weapon systems, related electronic subsystems, customized simulators and test sets. EDO Artisan advertised products include zero retention force arming units, helicopter blade crack indicators, and programmable DC power supplies, but the first of these products (the arming unit) is actually manufactured in the UK by EDO MBM Technology Ltd.

Specialty Plastics is a supplier of advanced composite piping systems for marine and offshore oil platform applications.

=== Intelligence and Information Warfare ===
The Intelligence and Information Warfare sector includes three business units: NexGen, EVI, and Impact Science & Technology.

EDO NexGen develops, deploys, and supports custom end-to-end solutions for U.S. government organizations. Core competencies include systems engineering, systems integration, design and development of custom hardware and software, and operational support.

EDO-EVI focuses on mission-driven research and development of custom communication systems for the U.S. Government. EVI specializes in rapid development and prototyping of hardware and software systems.

EDO-IST (Impact Science & Technology) provides Signals Intelligence (SIGINT) systems and analysis support to the intelligence community, and advanced countermeasures and electronic systems to government agencies.

=== Professional and Engineering Services ===
The Professional and Engineering Services sector includes three business units: Acquisition and Logistics Management Operations, EDO-CAS, and Technical Services Operations.

The Acquisition and Logistics Management Operations business unit provides advanced technology solutions, training and performance aids, acquisition logistics, strategic business solutions, warfare experimentation and analysis and engineering services.

The EDO-CAS business unit provides engineering services, logistics support and weapons-systems analysis to the U.S. Department of Defense.

The Technical Services Operations business unit provides Electronic Warfare engineering, systems maintenance, and flight test support services to the United States Air Force.

=== Undersea Warfare ===
The Undersea Warfare sector includes three business units: Defense Systems, Electro-Ceramics, and Naval Communications and Sonar System.

Defense Systems is a designer and manufacturer of electronic assemblies for military and space applications, and the development and production of electromechanical systems and equipment for government and commercial marine and aircraft applications. The area of interest that falls within this sector includes the Shallow Water Influence Minesweep System (SWIMS).

The Electro-Ceramics business unit provides ceramic-based products for defense and aerospace applications. These include underwater acoustic transducers and arrays for navigation and communication sonars for the US Navy and its prime contractors, seismic and offshore oil exploration, industrial positioning and actuation, and medical devices.

The Naval Communications and Sonar Systems product line includes Underwater Acoustic Products, Surface Ship Command and Control and Combat Systems Integration, Data Link Products, Shore-Based Command and Control Systems, Information Management Systems (IMS).

== Corporate governance ==
EDO's Board of Directors has adopted corporate governance guidelines and charters for each of its board committees. These documents, together with the Company's Ethical Business Guide, are the foundation of EDO's corporate governance and business conduct practices. The board reviews its governance guidelines and committee charters at least annually to ensure that EDO maintains and improves on its practices.

EDO's Director is Dennis C. Blair. Dennis C. Blair's membership on the board of directors of EDO Corporation, a subcontractor for the F-22 Raptor fighter program, and ownership of its stock was raised as a potential conflict of interest after the Institute for Defense Analyses issued a study that endorsed a three-year contract for the program. Blair told the Washington Post, "My review was not affected at all by my association with EDO Corp., and the report was a good one." He originally chose not to recuse himself because his link to EDO was not of sufficient "scale" to require it, but subsequently resigned from the EDO board to avoid any misperceptions.

However, on Wednesday, December 20, 2006 the Washington Post reported that the US Department of Defense Inspector General's investigation into the affair found Blair had certainly violated the Conflict of Interest rules.

== Criticism in the United States ==
=== 2004 fine ===
In 2004 EDO Corporation was ordered to pay a fine of $2.5 million. This matter was related to activities of the former Condor Systems company, before EDO acquired assets of Condor Systems during their bankruptcy proceedings. Charges are laid out in a letter from the U.S. State Department to EDO President and CEO James Smith. Senior Vice President of Condor Systems, Fredric B. Bassett is EDO's Senior Vice President-Finance, Treasurer, Chief Financial Officer.

=== The Earmarks affair ===
EDO Corporation has made payments from its Political Action Committee, to the political funds of both Republican and Democratic Party candidates, but these have tended to be to politicians who are on important government military defence and procurement committees. Controversy has arisen over contributions, to Senators Hillary Clinton, Charles Schumer and Congressman Steven Israel, who have then backed 'earmarked' government military contracts for EDO Corporation, soon afterwards.

On December 27, 2005, the New York Sun reported that:

Many of the companies and executives who won earmarks this year donated money not only to Senator Clinton, who sits on the Senate Armed Services Committee, and to Mr. Schumer, but also to Mr. Israel. And several of those designated for earmarks gave to members of the Joint Defense Appropriations Conference Committee, which wrote the New York projects into the defense spending bill.<

On 20 September 2006, the New York Sun reported EDO had gained further government defense contacts after giving financial donations to Washington insiders.

=== EDO President James M. Smith and the 2006 Executive Excess Report ===
On 30 August 2006, EDO Corporation Chairman, CEO, and President, James M. Smith, was named in a report produced by the Institute for Policy Studies and United for a Fair Economy, entitled 'Executive Excess'. Smith was reported as having received one of the highest percentage pay raises of any CEO in America, as a direct result of the 'War on terror' since 2001. His total compensation in 2006 was $1.8 million per year, up from $893,200 in 2001. In July 2006 Smith filed U.S. Securities and Exchange Commission (SEC) data showing he had sacked 400 workers at a factory in California after his management team had failed to secure a lucrative contract for anti-IED devices. In September 2003 EDO was listed by Fortune magazine as number 10 in the top 100 fastest growing companies in the U.S. EDO have failed to make the top 100 at all in recent years because of financial troubles. and are now owned by ITT Corporation.

=== EDO Director Dennis C. Blair and the EDO-IDA scandal ===
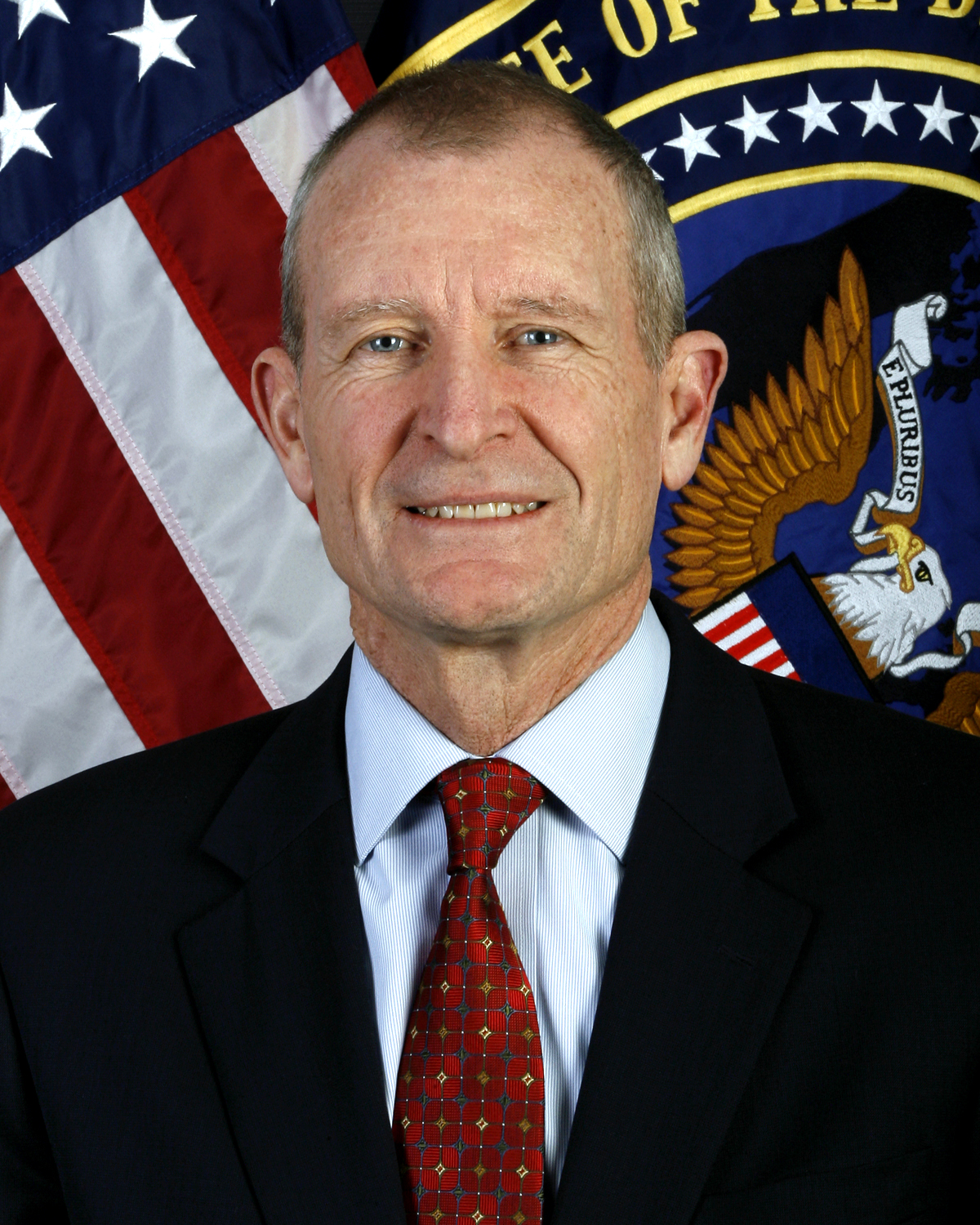
Admiral Dennis C. Blair.

Dennis C. Blair was until 2006 a Director of EDO Corp. He has also been a U.S. military commander and the Associate Director of the Central Intelligence Agency for Military Support. He is on record as having knowledge of covert CIA operations within allied countries that were intended to influence political affairs for the benefit of US interests.

On 25 July 2006, The Washington Post published an article by Pulitzer Prize–winning journalist R. Jeffrey Smith and Renae Merle. This detailed links between a think tank, the Institute for Defense Analyses (IDA) that had been commissioned as an independent advisor to the Pentagon, and EDO Corporation. The article exposed serious issues arising out of Blair's joint positions as president of IDA and as a director of EDO Corp.

The article was based on evidence gathered by a non-profit corruption watchdog, called the Project on Government Oversight (POGO) that had published a detailed report on the same day, entitled "Preying on The Taxpayer: The F22 Raptor." This report details evidence of a conflict of interest between IDA and EDO Corporation.

The POGO report describes how IDA had produced an independent study for the Pentagon, entitled F-22 A Multiyear Procurement Business Case Analysis, that advised the U.S. Congress that a multiyear procurement (MYP) of the Lockheed Martin F-22 Raptor could result in a cost savings, which is one of six requirements for issuing a multiyear procurement contract. The report did note, however, that this estimated cost savings was less than for other historical MYPs. Congress then approved the MYP, through a legislative amendment, proposed by Senator Saxby Chambliss (GA), partly on the basis of the report's findings. The IDA report was the only one at the time that backed an F-22 program extension, in contrast with two other previous reports that had advised against it. A separate study by RAND, however, commissioned in the wake of the IDA-EDO scandal, also estimated a cost savings associated with an F-22 MYP contract, which was actually larger than the estimated cost savings that IDA reported. The Chambliss amendment extended the production life of the Lockheed Martin F-22 Raptor by three years, overturning a previous decision to phase out the fighter plane because of safety and performance problems, as well as its huge expense. In testimony before the Senate Armed Services Airland Subcommittee, on 25 July 2006, POGO's Danielle Brian said: We do not know if Admiral Blair recused himself, or in any way affected the outcome of the IDA report. I would submit, however, that there is an appearance of a conflict of interest — given his substantial personal financial interest and his fiduciary responsibility to EDO—in the continued funding of the F-22A. This raises reasonable questions about the independence of IDA's analysis. EDO is an important sub contractor on the F22 program, being the sole supplier for the F22 AMRAAM vertical ejection launcher. As a director who owned shares in the company, Dennis Blair arguably stood to gain from any decision by Congress to extend the F22 program.

On 27 July 2006, The Washington Post reported that Dennis Blair had revealed that he would resign from the board of EDO Corporation, 'as soon as possible,' because of the revelations. Dennis Blair then submitted his letter of resignation on 31 July 2006.

On 13 September 2006, The Washington Post reported that Dennis Blair had resigned his position as president of the Institute of Defense Analyses after its trustees had found that a conflict of interest had occurred. Blair was asked to give up his other paid positions with military contractors, but he refused and instead chose to give up his position of president of IDA.

On 20 September 2006, Rolling Stone magazine published an article on the story entitled "Another Tale of Waste and Fraud Unpunished".

On 28 September 2006, The New York Times reported that the F-22 multiyear contract had been approved by Congress despite opposition from Donald Rumsfeld, George W. Bush and the present and future chairmen of top U.S. Government military procurement committees. The New York Times suggested that the military industrial lobby that pushed the F-22 multiyear programme was more powerful than the elected officials who oversee government military spending including the President of the United States himself.

On 1 December 2006, The Washington Post reported that the U.S. Inspector General had found that although Blair had indeed violated IDA's conflict of interest policy by working for both EDO and IDA at the same time, his actions had not affected IDA's results on the F-22. It also found that Blair's involvement in the IDA F-22 MYP study was "minimal," with no involvement in conducting the analysis or preparing or reviewing the report before it was finalized.

Dennis C. Blair was replaced as an EDO director by General John A. Gordon (ret), who is closely linked to Blair. In 1996 Gordon replaced Blair as Associate Director for Military Affairs at the CIA, and in 2007 Blair and Gordon sit together on the council of SAFE, a corporate-military think tank tasked with finding solutions to the approaching energy crisis.

In January 2009 Blair became Director of National Intelligence under President Barack Obama making him the highest ranking intelligence official in the US Government. He resigned this position in May 2010.

=== EDO Director Leslie Kenne and the Joint Strike Fighter contract ===
Lieutenant General Leslie Kenne spent 32 years in the United States Air Force. In 1997 she was appointed Director of the Joint Strike Fighter (JSF) program, the U.S. Department of Defense's largest ever military acquisition program with a budget of $30 billion. Lockheed Martin is the prime JSF program contractor. Lockheed Martin awarded EDO a contract on January 9, 2002 for the design, development and manufacture of a suite of pneumatic weapon delivery systems for the JSF.

Kenne resigned from the USAF in September 2003 and shortly afterwards joined the board of directors of EDO Corporation.

=== EDO Director Paul Kern and allegations of war crimes at Abu Ghraib/EDO links with Titan Corporation ===
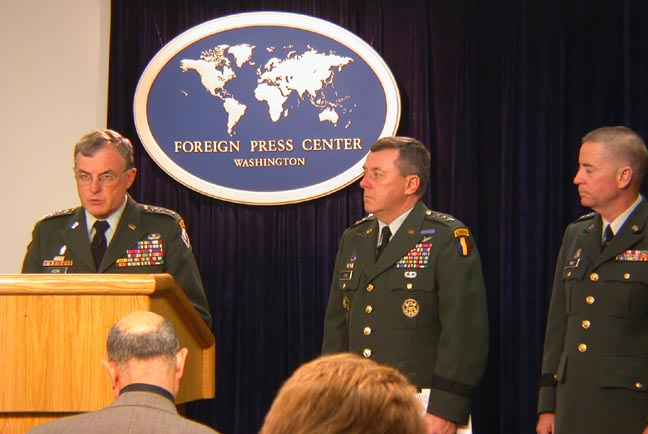
General Paul Kern receiving the report on the Abu Ghraib scandal from Generals George Fay and Anthony Jones

While still serving in the U.S. military General Paul Kern was appointed by Defense Secretary Donald Rumsfeld to report on an internal investigation into the Abu Ghraib torture and prisoner abuse. In August 2004 he presented the Fay Report largely absolving the military hierarchy of blame for the torture and sexual abuse. Kern blamed the torture in part on the civilian contractors working with military intelligence services in the prison. One of the companies involved was identified as Titan Corporation, a contractor that supplies technology and 'civilian interrogators' to military intelligence. (The company has close links to the US intelligence community. Former CIA director James Woolsey has served on its board of directors.) However Kern did not advise that Titan Corporation should be charged with any criminal offence. Kern had been picked by Rumsfeld to investigate the Military Intelligence operations at Abu Ghraib after an earlier report which had implicated them in the torture. This earlier report was called the Taguba Report and because of its controversial reference to 'systematic abuse' was kept secret until it was leaked to Seymour Hersh of The New Yorker. In June 2007 Hersh published an article on Taguba who was forced to resign after submitting the report to Rumsfeld.

A few enlisted U.S. soldiers were eventually convicted, and imprisoned as a result of the investigations. Titan Corporation sacked one of their employees Adel Nakhla who had admitted holding down prisoners who were being tortured. Another Titan employee John Israel, a 'civilian interrogator/interpreter' identified by the Taguba Report as one of the four main people believed to have been responsible for the torture is suspected by some journalists including Robert Fisk of being an Israeli agent.

In April 2008 the Bush Administration were ordered to release a memo under the Freedom of Information Act that showed it had approved torture techniques in 2003 and given legal argument support for the use of torture techniques.

Kern retired shortly after the report came out and in January 2005 joined EDO Corporation as a director. Two of the other ten EDO Corporation directors who helped to elect him, James Roth and Robert M. Hanisee, were, and remain directors of Titan Corporation and as directors are open to charges of collusion and direct involvement in war crimes according to international law, but they have not been prosecuted by the United States legal system. Despite a lack of political will by the US Government to prosecute, Titan Corporation and CACI were nonetheless defendants in a civil action brought by victims of the torture in Abu Ghraib Prison.

The U.S. Military Commissions Act of 2006 effectively brought an end to such legal actions in the US.

In 2005, Titan Corp. admitted bribery charges after it paid $2 million into the re-election fund of the President of Benin, Mathieu Kérékou.

Kern is also a member of the Cohen Group which has as its CEO yet another EDO Corp director, Robert S. Tyrer.

== Protest in the UK ==
=== Regular anti-war protests outside EDO (UK) factory ===
On 21 September 2006, protesters blockaded the EDO MBM factory in Brighton for several hours forcing the Managing Director Paul Hills to scale a security fence to enter the premises. He then used an angle grinder or wire cutters to cut a hole in the EDO's fence to let the employees in to work. The protesters left the scene without being arrested. On 16 September 2006, 100 protesters marched through Brighton to deliver a petition to Brighton Town Hall calling for the closure of EDO MBM. On 23 August 2006 two protesters climbed 40 feet onto the roof of EDO MBM Technology Ltd to unfurl a banner protesting the company's supply of weapons to Israel used in the Qana bombing in which 16 Lebanese children were killed. On 19 July 2006 protesters staged a 'Horrors of War' demonstration outside the Brighton factory recreating scenes of violence and mutilation that result from aerial bombardment. On the morning of 17 July 2006, three activists completely blockaded EDO's Brighton, United Kingdom subsidiary EDO MBM Technology Ltd in protest at EDO's supply of weapons technology to the Israeli military being used to attack Gaza and in the then ongoing 2006 Israel-Lebanon conflict. These are just a few actions in an ongoing campaign of protest, civil disobedience and non-violent direct action against EDO in Brighton that began in 2004 and has come to be known as the Smash EDO campaign.

=== Smash EDO campaign ===
There have been numerous protests and direct actions since 2004 voicing the opinion that EDO MBM should close or convert its factory to civilian use. In January 2009, during the Gaza War, activists raided EDO's factory in Moulsecombe and destroyed equipment. In 2010, a jury found the activists, who invoked the lawful excuse defence, according to which it can be lawful to commit an offence to prevent a more serious crime, not guilty of conspiring to cause criminal damage to the factory. Jonathan Hoffman, vice-chair of the Zionist Federation of Great Britain and Ireland, claimed the judge had "behaved more like the defence counsel than the neutral officer of the court that he was supposed to be. The role of a judge – far from advancing his own political agenda – is to clarify points of law to the lay members of the jury..."

=== The Zero Retention Force Arming Unit ===
The Zero Retention Force Arming Unit (ZRFAU) is a military electro mechanical device. EDO MBM Technology Ltd are sole owners of the proprietary rights to one such unit and act as technical support and design authority for its ongoing use and installation.

The units are used in U.S. Navy BRU-32, BRU-41, BRU-42, BRU-45, the US Air Force BRU-46 & BRU-47, the Royal Australian Air Force MAU-12, the European Tornado HMERU & LMERU bomb racks. The ZRFAU is also used in the Israeli Military Industries (IMI) VER-2 Bomb Rack, a bomb rack also owned by EDO MBM Technology Ltd, and advertised for sale by a subsidiary of Elbit Systems Ltd in Israel, Israeli Ministry of Defense for the Israeli air force F-16.

Following investigations by campaigners into EDO MBM's links with Israel, and the submission of documents showing these links in court as part of a defence of Palestine Solidarity protesters, EDO MBM removed from their website a reference stating it was 'actively manufacturing' ZRFAUs, claiming this statement had been 'an error'. Directors of EDO(UK)Ltd, the parent company of EDO MBM admitted that a US subsidiary, Artisan Technologies, in New Jersey, did manufacture the component supplied to Israel. This subsidiary was owned by EDO UK from 2000 until it was sold in 2008. Despite the sale of the company officially manufacturing the ZRFAU, EDO MBM continue to be the sole point of contact for sales and technical support for the component from 2000 to the present day.

In November 2009 the Information Tribunal looking at EDO MBM's export licence applications held by the Dept for Business (BIS) found "There was no dispute that the ERU151 and the ZRFAU are components which can be incorporated into VER-2 bomb racks for use with F-16 combat aircraft, that those aircraft are used by the Israeli air force, and that from 1998 EDO owned the right to manufacture the ERU151 and the ZRFAU.'" But "After examining the documents, it concluded the information did not confirm claims that EDO supplied Israel, and therefore the documents should remain confidential. It was then established that EDO MBM's involvement with the design, development, technical support and supply of the ZRFAU had been taking place without any apparent UK export controls, in an apparent breach of UK legislation.

In June 2010 in the EDO Decommissioners Case a jury of twelve members of the UK public acquitted seven people of conspiracy to cause £180,000 criminal damage to the EDO MBM factory, on the grounds that their belief that EDO MBM had been supplying Israel with the ZRFAU at the time of Operation Cast Lead and by extension their belief that EDO MBM were complicit in war crimes carried out by Israel against the people of Gaza was a reasonable belief. It followed that it also reasonable to damage the factory to the tune of £180,000 in order to try and in some small way stop these Israeli war crimes and protect Palestinian property. Even Paul Hills, the Director of EDO MBM, had accepted during the trial that the activists belief was 'not unreasonable,' in light of all the documents that appeared to establish the fact, although as in previous sworn testimony over five years, he continued to deny any such involvement.

=== VER-2 ===
VER- 2 means Vertical Ejector Rack (for) 2 (bombs), and is designed for the US produced F-16 and F-18. In the 1990s Lucas Western Corporation helped Israel Military Industries design a rack for Israeli F-16s. A Jane's Defence Weekly (JDW) article, in June 1996, stated that "Israel's F16s use VER-2 vertical ejection bomb racks made by Israeli Military Industries (IMI)" IMI later sold this part of its business to Elbit. In 2005 the managing director of EDO MBM admitted that the company had acquired all the rights to the VER-2 from Lucas Western in 1998 and had since been 'jointly marketing it for a third party country'. He stated under oath that he had removed references to the VER-2 from the EDO MBM website, after protests began in Brighton in 2004, to avoid controversy [42]

In May 2009 managing director Paul Hills told The Argus: "I would and have stood up in court and sworn under oath that we don't supply to Israel, which is one of the things Smash EDO accuse us of."

=== EDO MBM and UN Peace Messenger City Brighton and Hove ===
EDO MBM was originally targeted by protesters because it represents the most direct link between the Iraq War the Occupation of Palestine and the UK city of Brighton and Hove. The city council was the first in the country to be awarded United Nations Peace Messenger City status and yet it owns the land, Home Farm Business Park, on which EDO MBM's factory stands. EDO rent the property through a third party company, Europa Holdings Ltd, who hold a 125-year lease on the section of the park where EDO has its factory. Till early 2005 the same lease was held by Cheshire County Council.

EDO MBM provided essential arming and release components for the Raytheon Paveway 'smart munitions' used extensively in the shock and awe bombing by US/UK forces at the outset of the Iraq war. This led to the deaths of tens of thousands of civilians. EDO MBM have been awarded a contract to provide components for the next generation Paveway IV 'fire and forget' smart bomb for the UK RAF.

As a result of the apparent contradiction of being a peace messenger city while being the landlord of an arms company, Brighton City Council in July 2005 came close to passing a motion of censure against EDO MBM. At the end of a full council meeting, in which debate on the motion was refused on grounds of time limits, the council eventually passed a watered down amendment to the motion that struck out all mention of the company and instead resolved to raise a UN peace flag above the town hall on one day each year. In March 2007, shortly after a Green Party councillor had taken on the role of 'peace messenger' from a member of the ruling Labour Party group, Brighton council announced they were scrapping the peace messenger city status for financial reasons.

=== Injunction case: EDO MBM v Campaign to Smash EDO & others/EDO MBM v Axworthy & others ===
The ongoing protests led EDO MBM and its employees, in April 2005, to seek a permanent high court injunction against 14 named protesters and two protest groups Smash EDO and Bombs out Of Brighton, on grounds of harassment. The intended injunction brought under Section 3 of the Protection from Harassment Act 1997, applied to all protesters, not only those named in the court papers (who in any case strongly denied the allegations). The case created controversy because it was seen by some as an unjustified measure used by a U.S. arms company to suppress the freedom to protest of UK anti-war protesters. Others, however, suggested that the court action was used in order to prevent harassment and violent crime. The company failed to gain a permanent injunction and dropped the action in early 2006, at a cost of several million dollars in legal costs.

=== Allegations of Sussex Police collusion with EDO MBM ===
In the course of the high court battle a temporary or interim injunction was imposed on all protesters until a full trial could deal with the full facts of the case. The restrictions on protests and the aggressive strategy of Sussex Police brought about by this injunction, led to dozens of arrests and public order criminal charges against protesters. Two protesters spent up to a week in Lewes prison (on remand) as a result of arrests for alleged breaches of the injunction. The first for using a video camera to gather evidence of an assault on a protester by a security guard, and the second for stepping into a road opposite the factory. These charges carried a penalty of up to five years in prison on conviction. The cases would have had Crown Court jury trials if not dropped by the CPS. Others were arrested after allegations that they had disobeyed police orders, assaulted police, or obstructed them in the enforcement of the injunction.

After evidence came to light in the High Court that Sussex Police may have colluded with EDO Corporation to exaggerate the threat posed by demonstrators to the safety of employees, defence solicitors in related criminal cases began to investigate further. Then in what appeared to be a domino effect, the Crown Prosecution Service proceeded to drop all criminal charges, against all protesters, in all related cases, in an effort to protect the confidentiality of internal Sussex police documents which may have helped defendants prove such collusion had taken place. In July 2006 13 official complaints against Sussex Police were filed by protesters alleging police collusion with the arms company.

== EDO (UK) Chairman Sir Robert Walmsley questioned ==
Sir Robert Walmsley is a director of EDO Corporation, and is Chairman of the Board of EDO (UK), which includes EDO MBM Technology Ltd in Brighton. On 1 August 2004 The Independent reported that Sir Robert Walmsley, Former Chief of Procurement at the UK Ministry of Defence, who retired in April 2003, had been called in by a UK government watchdog, the Advisory Committee on Business Appointments, to answer questions about his appointments to the board of Directors of General Dynamics and EDO Corporation.

General Dynamics was awarded the (£1.7 billion) Prime Contractor and Systems Integration contract for the BOWMAN secure, digital voice and data communications system in September 2001, while Walmsley was still in charge of MOD procurement. On retirement in April 2003 Warmsley was offered a lucrative directorship of General Dynamics. A government watchdog committee advised Walmsley not to take up the post for one year after he had retired from the MOD, to avoid the appearance of a 'reward' being given by General Dynamics to Walmsley. Walmsley publicly joined General Dynamics in April 2004. He had by then, already become a non-executive director on the board of British Energy.

In The Independent report, UK Prime Minister Tony Blair was said to have dismissed the watchdog recommendations that tighter rules were needed over such issues. In a later report published by The Independent on 26 December 2004, Blair was alleged to have helped 'mandarins' such as Walmsley, gain top jobs in the private sector, in defiance of anti-corruption committees. In May 2006, The Independent reported UK Government plans to scrap anti-corruption watchdog committees.

=== Sir Robert Walmsley and the Global Dominance Group ===
In 2006 Sir Robert Walmsley was named in a report 'The Global Dominance Group' produced by the US research group Project Censored. Walmsley is cited as one of 240 people considered as the world's top advocates of neo-conservative US global military domination.

=== Sir Robert Walmsley and the Al Yamamah arms scandal ===
Sir Robert Walmsley has also been linked to controversy over the Al Yamamah arms deal with Saudi Arabia which was conducted in such secrecy that government National Audit Office reports into the deal remain classified. The deal has been associated with bribery and corruption allegations, and was the subject of a police investigation until dropped in controversial circumstances. Police were denied access to an NAO report because it is classified. A The Daily Telegraph report on 7 July 2006 reported, that judging from a list documents released under the Freedom of Information Act (FOIA), that there had been two classified NAO reports rather than just one as previously thought. The revelation came about through the title of one of the documents: "Letter from Sir Robert Walmsley, Chief of Defence Procurement to C&AG [NAO head Sir John Bourn] responding to recommendations in draft audit findings - 30 March 1998" which apparently refers to a draft of a second secret NAO report.
