= Hollingbury Castle =

Hillfort in East Sussex, England

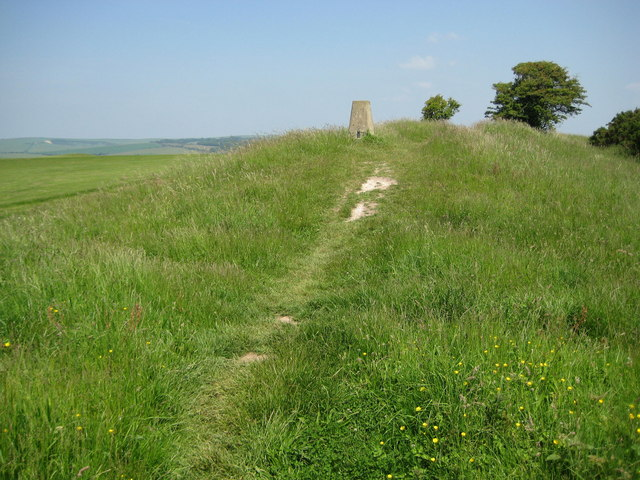
- Looking north along the bank on the western side, showing the trig point

- Location within East Sussex
- 50°51′19″N 0°7′23″W
- Type: Hillfort
- Periods: Bronze Age; Iron Age
- Location: Near Brighton, East Sussex
- OS grid reference: TQ 322 079

Site notes
- Area: 9 acres (3.6 ha)

Scheduled monument
- Designated: 4 August 1933
- Reference no.: 1014526

Hollingbury Castle, also known as Hollingbury Camp and Hollingbury Hillfort, is an Iron Age hillfort on the northern edge of Brighton, in East Sussex, England. It is adjacent to Hollingbury Park Golf Course.

It is a scheduled monument.

== Description ==
There is a single bank and ditch, in roughly the shape of a square with rounded corners, enclosing an area of about 9 acres (3.6 ha). There are original entrances on the east and west sides, the western entrance being inturned on both sides. The pottery found during excavations dates from about 450–250 BC.

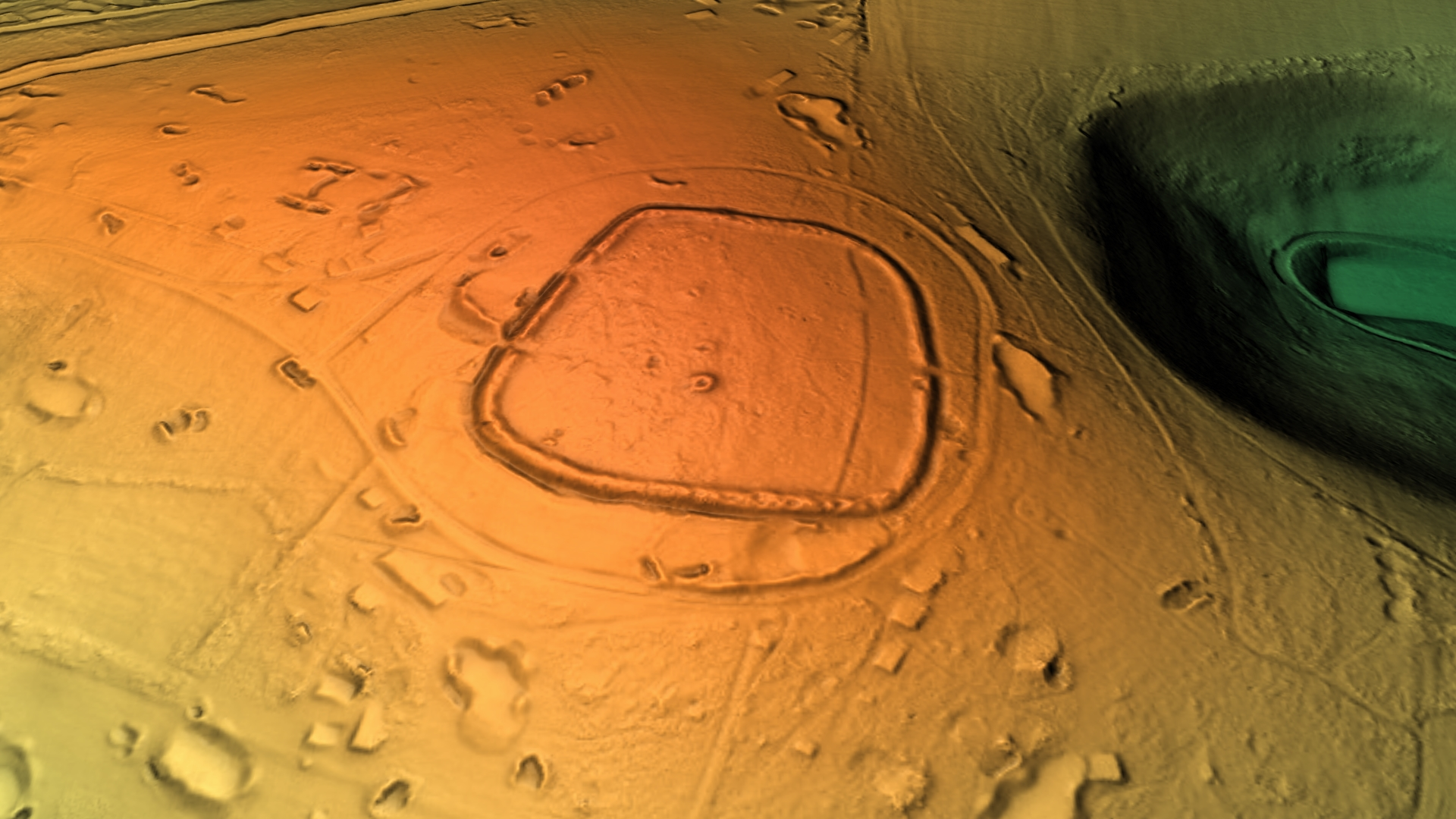
3D view of the digital terrain model

The enclosure contains three Bronze Age bowl barrows, aligned roughly north–south near the centre. There is documentary evidence suggesting that the southernmost barrow, of diameter about 14 metres (46 ft) and height about 1 metre (3 ft), was the site of a beacon in medieval and post-medieval periods.

=== Excavations ===
There was excavation of the site by E. C. Curwen in 1931. It was established that there was an earlier, slightly smaller enclosure: the eastern side of this survives as a low bank aligned north–south, with a filled-in ditch to its east, about 25 metres (27 yd) within the eastern rampart, the other sides of the earlier enclosure being beneath the later fort.

The 1931 excavation also revealed postholes at the north-east side and east entrance, showing that the rampart was originally a box rampart, filled with rubble and reinforced with timbers, with a berm and a ditch beyond the outer timbers. Modern posts were placed to mark the position of the postholes.

Excavation of 1967–69 showed the remains of five round houses, of diameters 4.25–12.25 metres (14–40 ft), from the early 6th century BC, in the south-west corner.
