= Cemeteries and crematoria in Brighton and Hove =

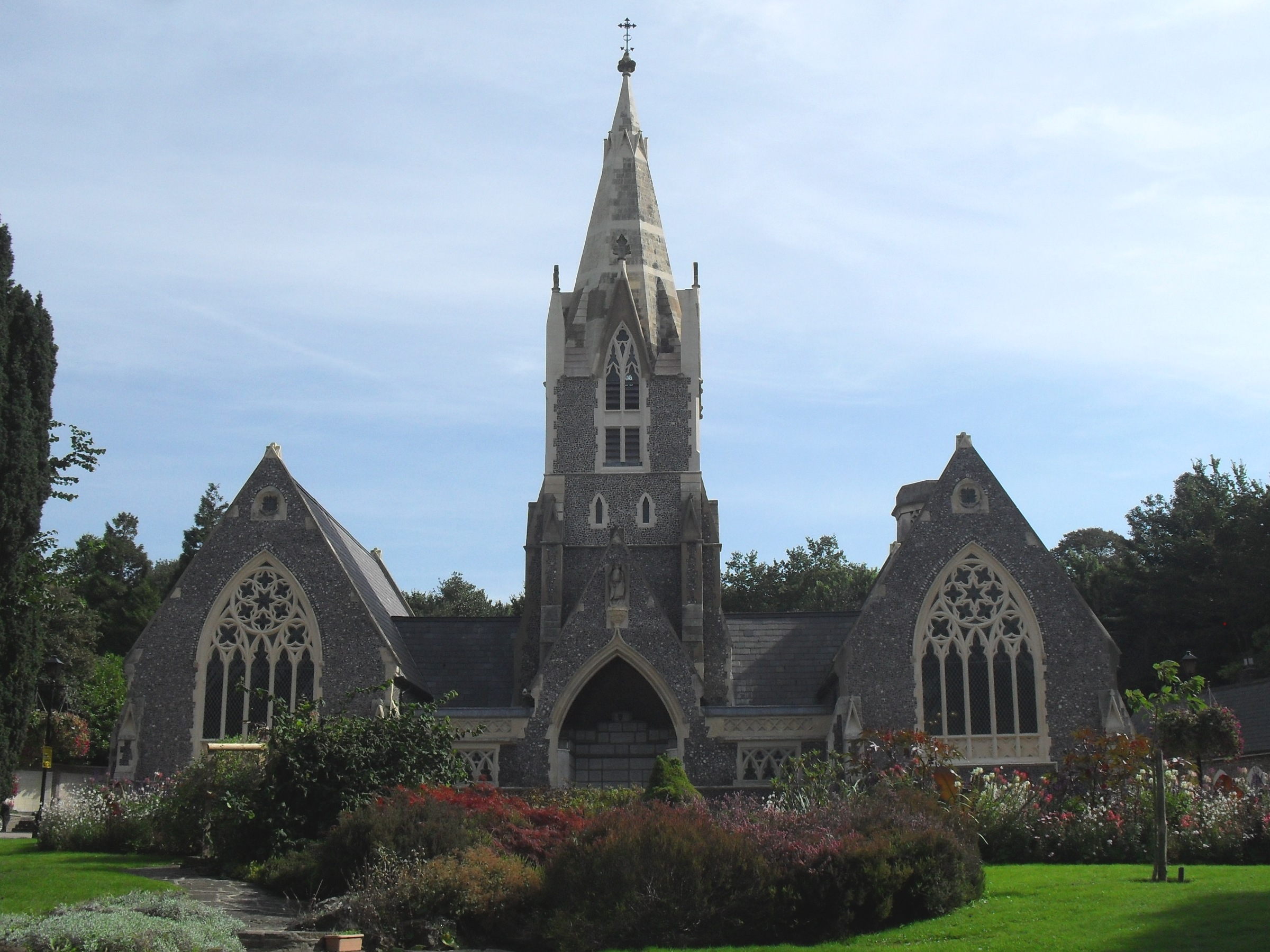
In 1930, a crematorium was added to the 1857 chapels of the Woodvale Cemetery off Lewes Road, Brighton. It was the first crematorium in Sussex.

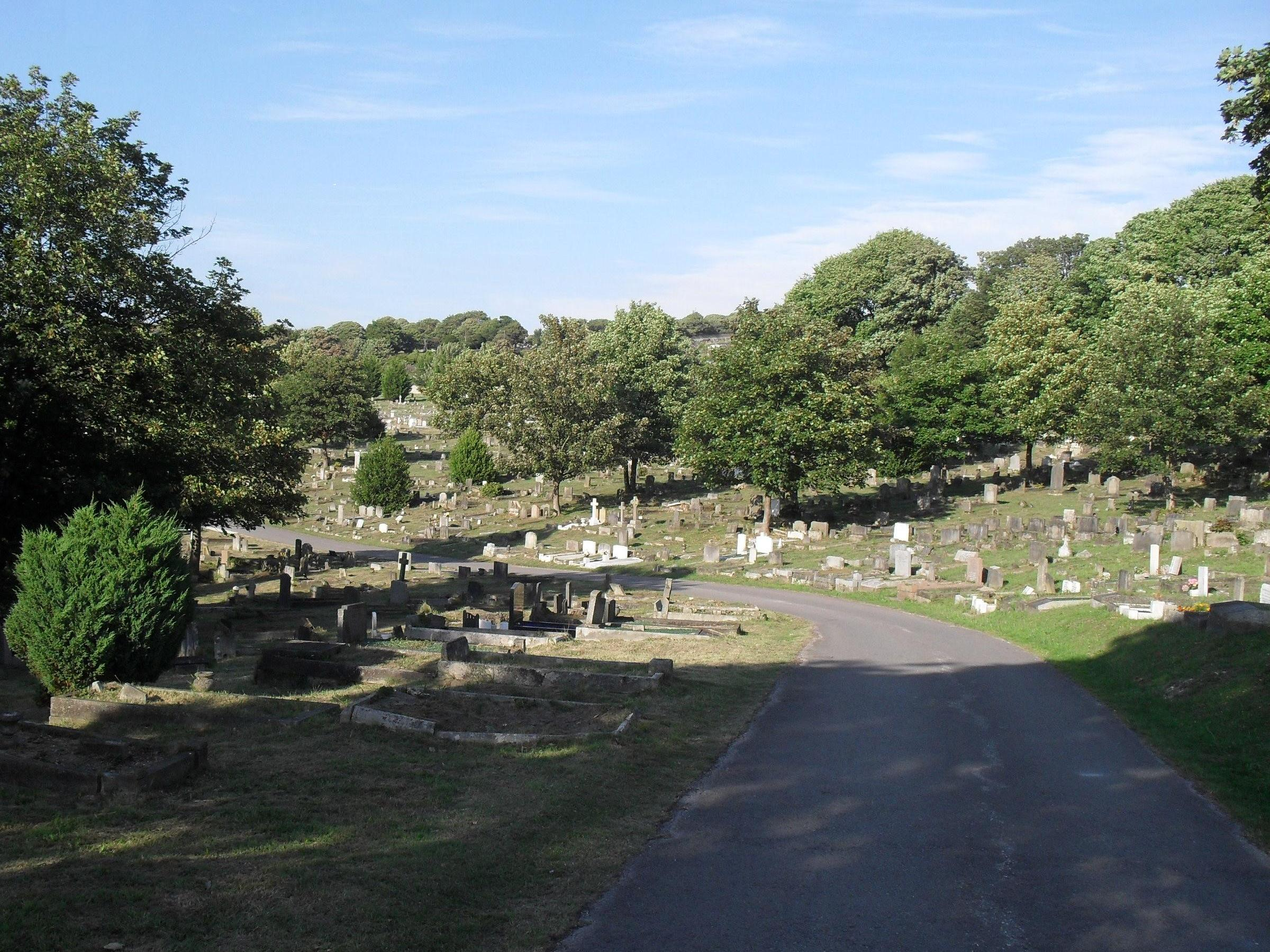
This is the main path through the Brighton and Preston Cemetery. Heavily wooded, undulating terrain in peaceful valleys formed an "ideal landscape" for Brighton's elaborate Victorian-era burials.

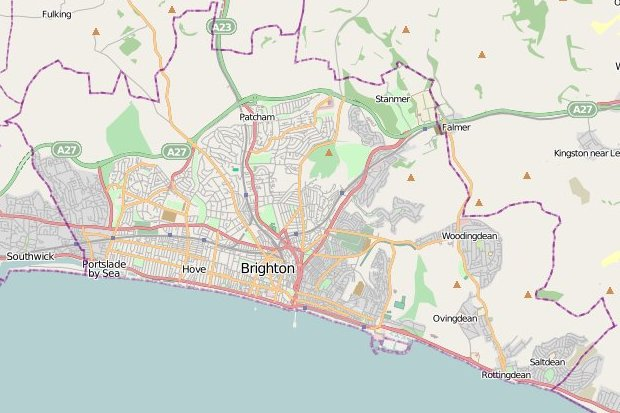
Map of Brighton and Hove showing churchyards and chapel burial grounds (blue) and cemeteries (red). Hover over points to see their name.

The English coastal city of Brighton and Hove, made up of the formerly separate Boroughs of Brighton and Hove in East Sussex, has a wide range of cemeteries throughout its urban area. Many were established in the mid-19th century, a time in which the Victorian "cult of death" encouraged extravagant, expensive memorials set in carefully cultivated landscapes which were even recommended as tourist attractions. Some of the largest, such as the Extra Mural Cemetery and the Brighton and Preston Cemetery, were set in particularly impressive natural landscapes. Brighton and Hove City Council, the local authority responsible for public services in the city, manages seven cemeteries, one of which also has the city's main crematorium. An eighth cemetery and a second crematorium are owned by a private company. Many cemeteries are full and no longer accept new burials. The council maintains administrative offices and a mortuary at the Woodvale Cemetery, and employs a coroner and support staff.

Until the early 19th century, by which time Brighton was already growing rapidly as it developed from a fishing village into a fashionable seaside resort, all burials took place at churches, chapels or the Jewish community's newly established burial ground. Brighton Extra Mural Company founded the first private cemetery in the town in 1851. A similar situation existed in Hove and its westerly neighbour Portslade, where pressure for burial space around St Andrew's and St Nicolas' parish churches respectively resulted in the establishment of municipal cemeteries there. In the 20th century, as space became scarce and cremation became more socially acceptable, new and extended burial grounds were established and the Woodvale Crematorium, built in 1930, became increasingly important.

Many structures in the cemeteries and graveyards of Brighton and Hove are of significant historical and architectural interest; reflecting this, many have been listed by English Heritage, the public body responsible for the administration of England's historic built environment. Listed structures include individual tombs, burial vaults, cemetery chapels and various structures at the entrances to the city's cemeteries. In many cases, the historic interest of an individual grave is based on the local or wider fame of its occupant.

The 20th-century expansion of Brighton and its neighbour Hove brought several villages, formerly outside the urban area, into the area controlled by the boroughs. Ancient settlements such as Ovingdean, Rottingdean, Stanmer, Patcham and Hangleton each had their own parish church with a long-established graveyard.

== History ==
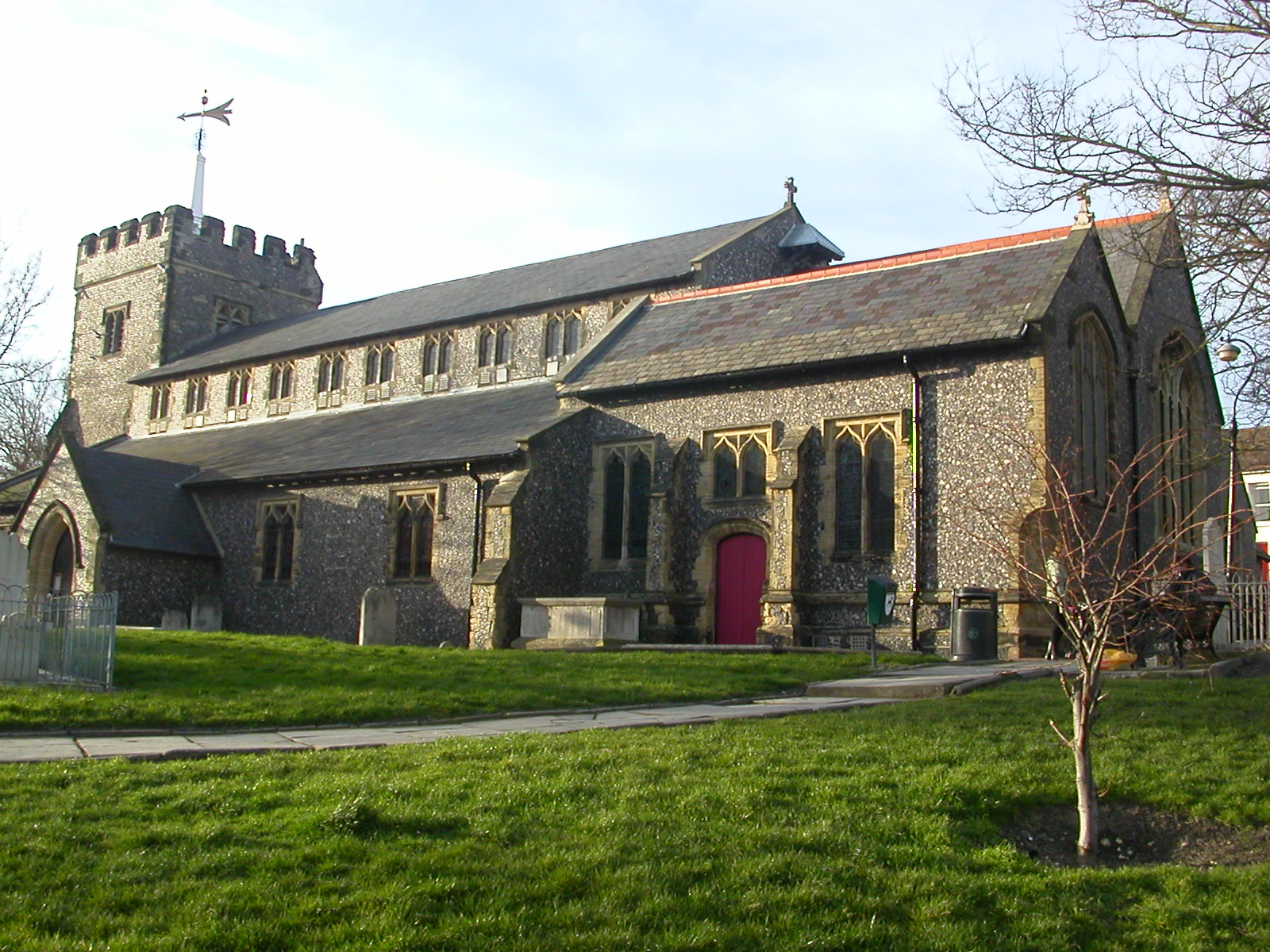
Burials in Brighton took place around St Nicholas' Church until the 1850s.

For hundreds of years in towns and villages across England, it was customary to bury the dead in the churchyard of the parish church. The Saxon fishing village of Bristelmestune, which grew and evolved into Brighthelmstone and later Brighton, was no different: St Nicholas' Church, which stood on a hill behind and separate from the settlement, was surrounded by a churchyard on the sloping land alongside Church Hill (the present Dyke Road). Protestant Nonconformists who did not attend the parish church were not catered for separately until the Quaker community established a burial ground next to their own place of worship in 1690.

Brighton's transformation from a declining fishing village to a fashionable seaside resort patronised by royalty, the nobility and daytrippers alike took place between the mid-18th century—when Dr Richard Russell published his theories on the apparent health benefits of sea-bathing and drinking seawater, and recommended Brighton as the ideal venue—and the mid-19th century, when the town was connected to London by railway line. It became the largest town in Sussex at the start of the 19th century, and the population grew from about 7,000 in 1801 to 40,000 in 1831, including a doubling in the 1811–1821 period. This put great pressure on the remaining land around the church: graves were already so closely spaced that maintenance was difficult to carry out. A small extension to the east was made in 1818, and in 1824 the church bought a site north of Church Street and behind St Nicholas' Church and laid it out as extra burial space. This was full by 1841, and another extension was opened west of Church Hill (Dyke Road).

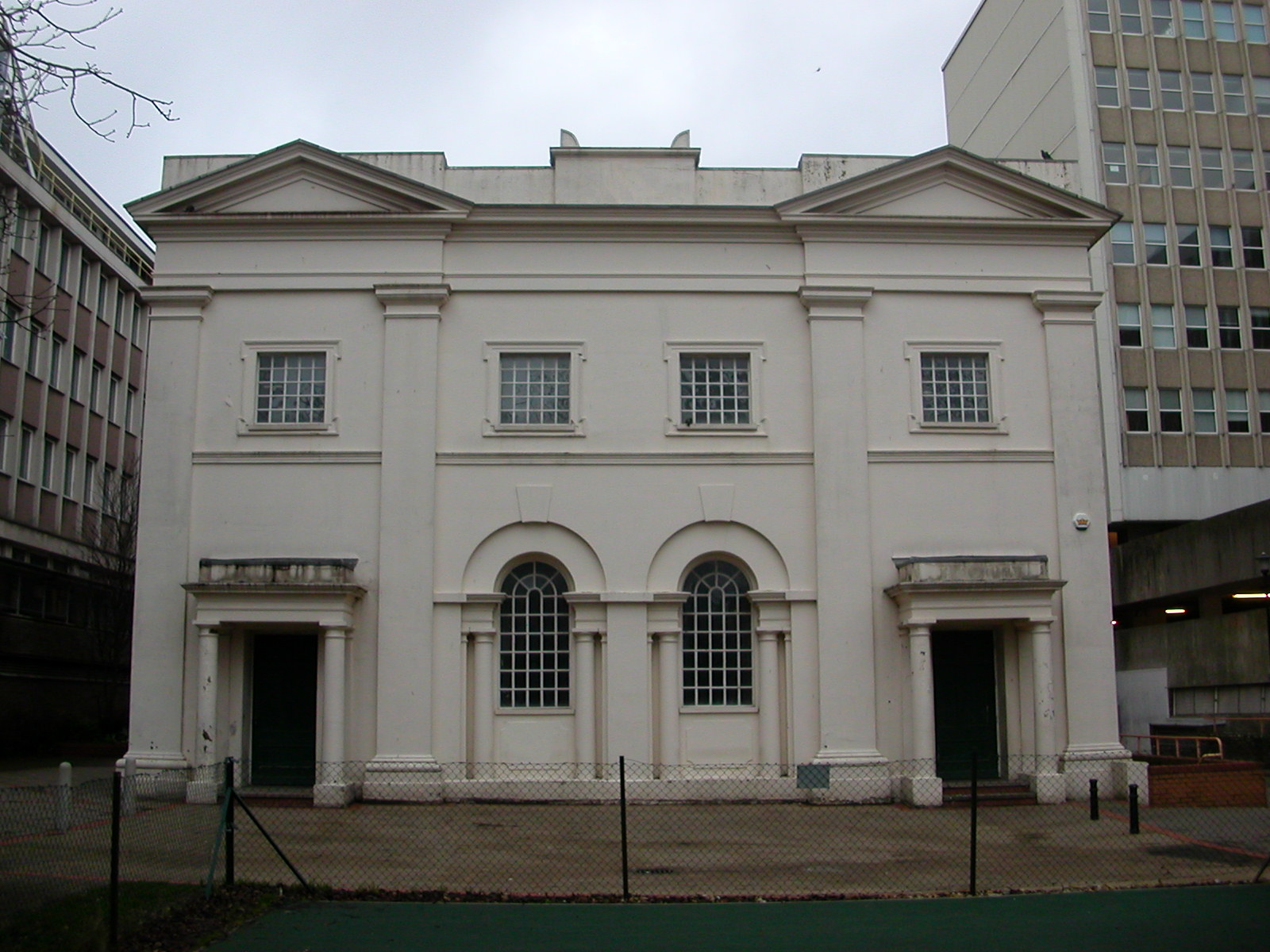
The Nonconformist Hanover Chapel also had its own burial ground.

The Public Health Act 1848 sought to improve the sanitary conditions and public health in Britain's growing towns. Edward Cresy, a Government health inspector, was sent to Brighton in 1849 to report on its conditions and recommend actions which would make the town compliant with the Act. He advised that burials around the town's churches and chapels should cease, which would have affected St Nicholas' Church, the Presbyterian Hanover Chapel in North Road and the Quaker Friends Meeting House in Ship Street. (Although Brighton had 11 Anglican churches by the time, excluding St Nicholas', none had their own burial grounds.) Cresy's recommendation was enforced from 1 October 1853, when the Government passed the Burials (Beyond the Metropolis) Act 1853 and prohibited burials around any of Brighton's places of worship.

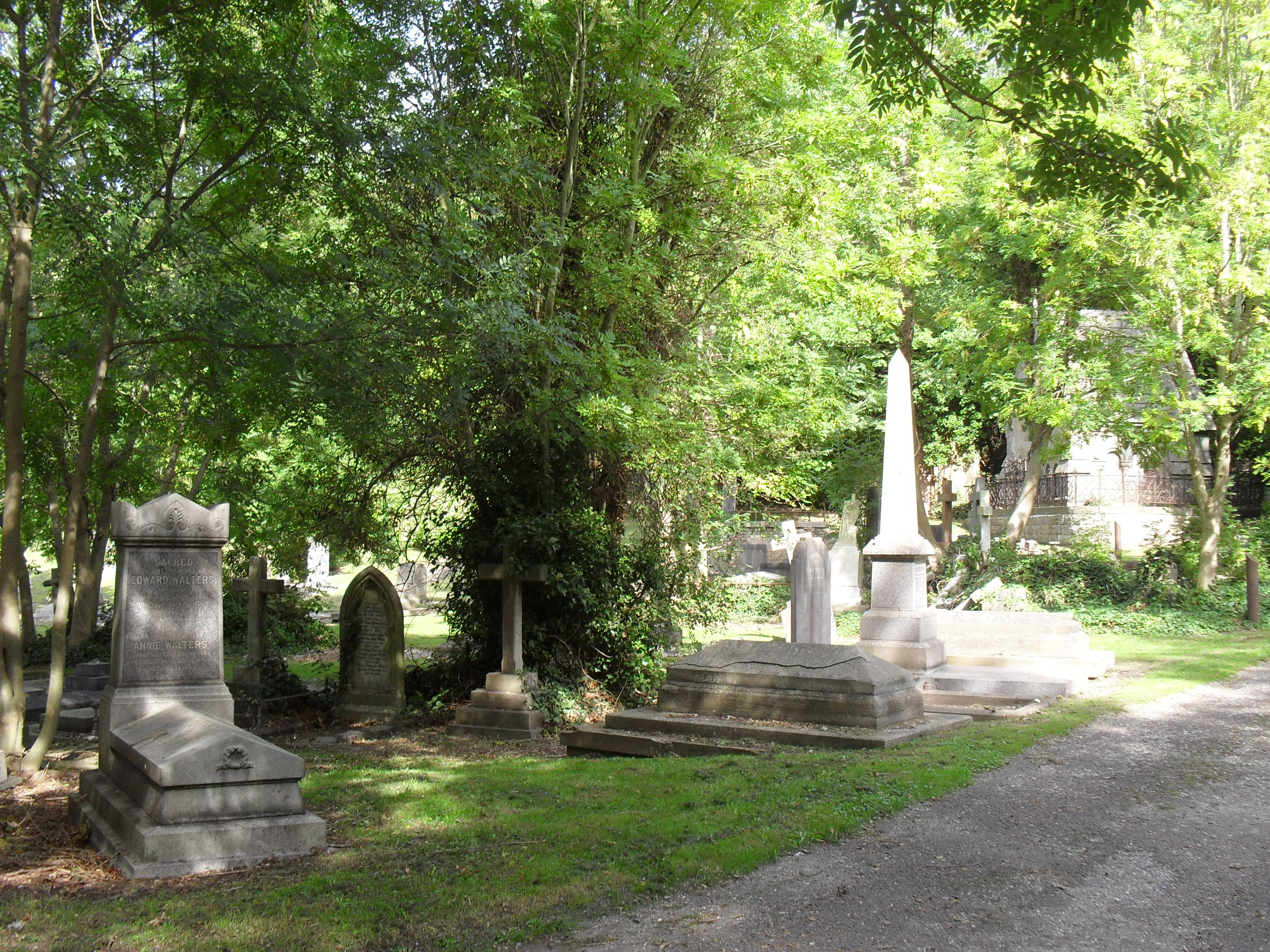
The Extra Mural Cemetery, "one of the most delightful spots in the whole of Brighton", was consecrated in 1851.

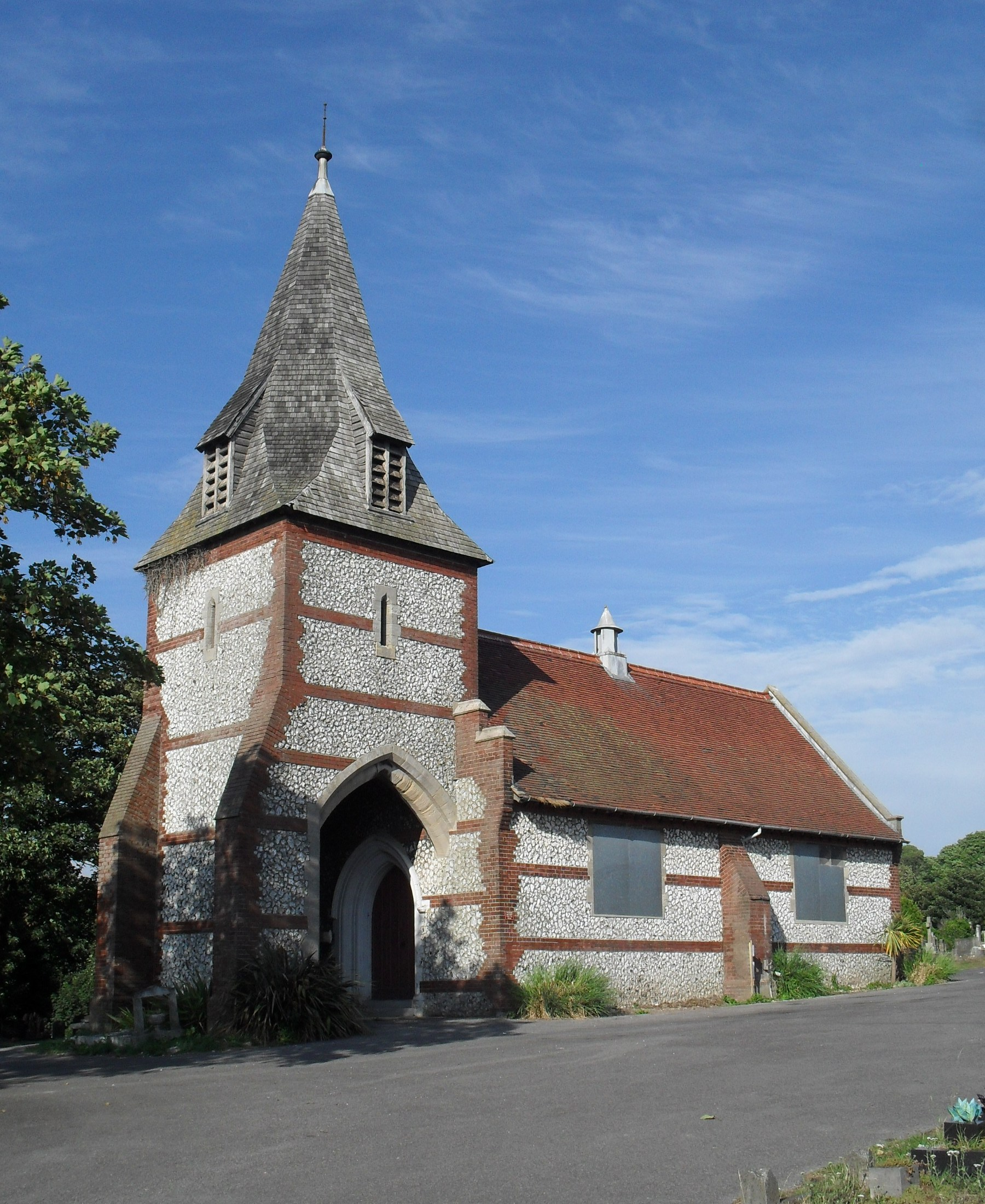
The privately run Brighton and Preston Cemetery, opened in 1886, has its own mortuary chapel—a spire-topped building of red brick and knapped flint.

Immediately after Cresy published his report, though, a group of public figures in Brighton took action themselves. They included doctor and politician John Cordy Burrows, the Union Chapel's minister Rev. John Nelson Goulty, his son the architect Horatio Nelson Goulty, and fellow architect Amon Henry Wilds. In 1850, they formed the Brighton Extra Mural Company for the purposes of acquiring land and establishing a private cemetery for Anglican, Roman Catholic and Nonconformist burials. They bought 13 acres (5.3 ha) east of the Lewes Road and near Race Hill. Apart from a small section for non-Anglican burials, the land was consecrated by Ashurst Turner Gilbert, the Bishop of Chichester, on 14 August 1851, and burials took place from November that year. The land formed part of Scabe's Castle Farm, established in the 18th century.

The Marquess of Bristol owned much of the land surrounding the old farm, and in 1856 he gave the Brighton Extra Mural Company 8 acres (3.2 ha) adjoining the northeast side of the existing cemetery. It was consecrated for Anglican burials on 14 November 1857, and was known from the start as the Bristol Ground. He also helped with the founding of Brighton's second purpose-built cemetery. When the Government prohibited any more burials around St Nicholas' Church in 1853, the Vestry (who were responsible for the administration and running of the parish church) needed land quickly to carry out new burials—in particular of paupers, who became the Vestry's responsibility when they died. The Vestry asked the Brighton Extra Mural Company to sell the new Extra Mural Cemetery to them, but they were quoted £25,000 (£2,746,000 as of 2025) and a five-shilling charge (£30 as of 2025) per pauper burial. The Vestry considered this unacceptable. In early 1856 they had the chance to buy 30 acres (12 ha) of land opposite the Extra Mural Cemetery, on the east side of Lewes Road, for £7,500 (£698,000 as of 2025), but the Vestry again refused—despite the recommendations of the newly formed Brighton Burial Board. Then in April 1856, the Marquess of Bristol and the tenant of the land, Mayor of Brighton William Hallett, gave the Vestry 20 acres (8.1 ha) of land adjoining the south side of the Extra Mural Cemetery. It was run by the Burial Board under the name Brighton Parochial Cemetery, and was designed and consecrated in 1857. It was taken over by Brighton Borough Council in 1902, and is now called Woodvale Cemetery.

The north ends of the two cemeteries reached as far north as Bear Road, a steep road which was part of Brighton Borough's boundary until 1928. Immediately north of the road, a third cemetery opened in 1868 on a 31.5-acre (12.7 ha) site. It was known as Brighton Borough Cemetery or Bear Road Cemetery. A fourth large cemetery opened in the same area in 1886. The privately owned Brighton and Preston Cemetery Company Ltd laid out the Brighton and Preston Cemetery on the remaining 30 acres (12 ha) of the former Scabe's Castle Farm land between Hartington Road and the south side of the Brighton Parochial Cemetery.

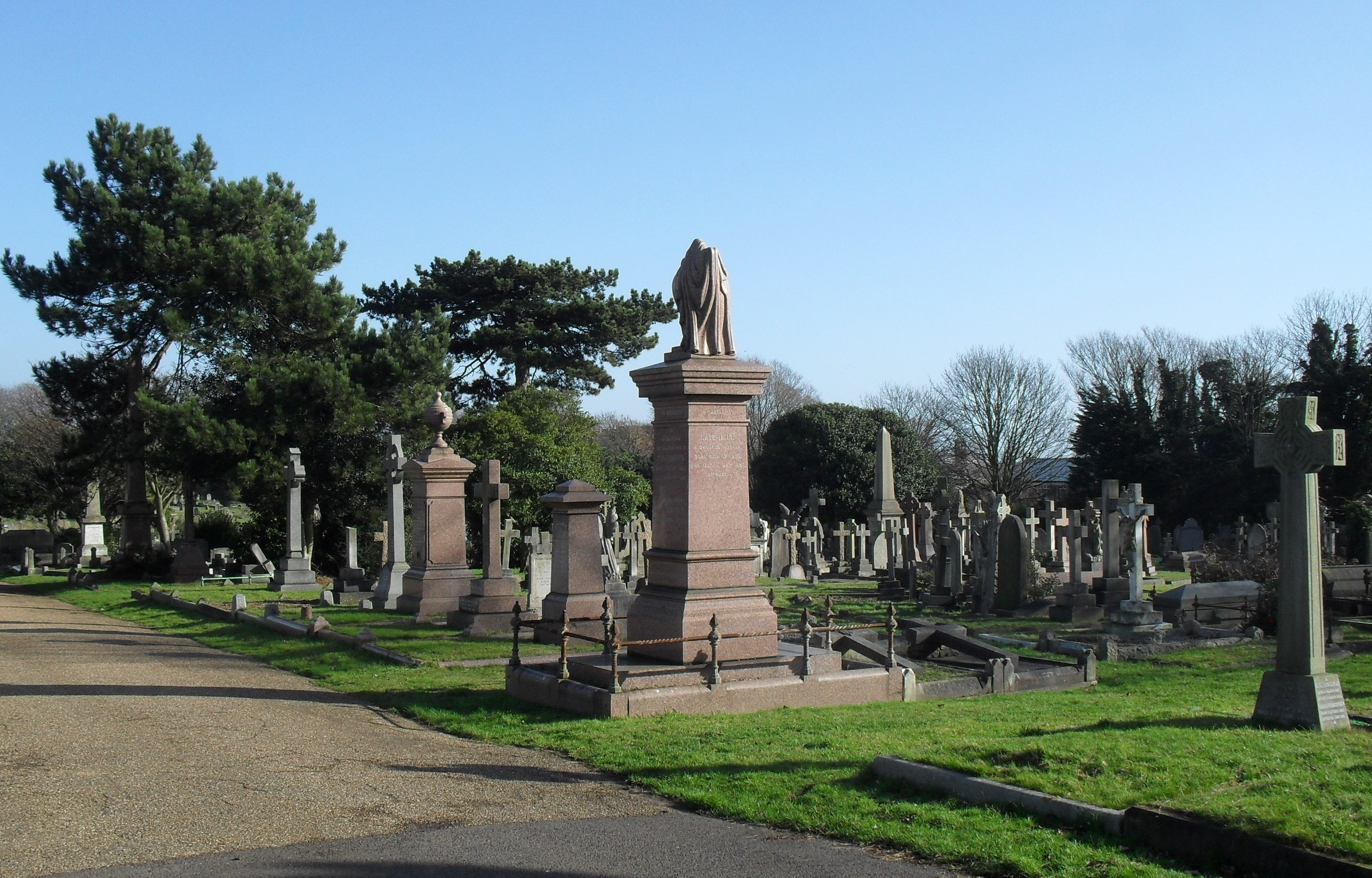
Development of Hove Cemetery began in 1879.

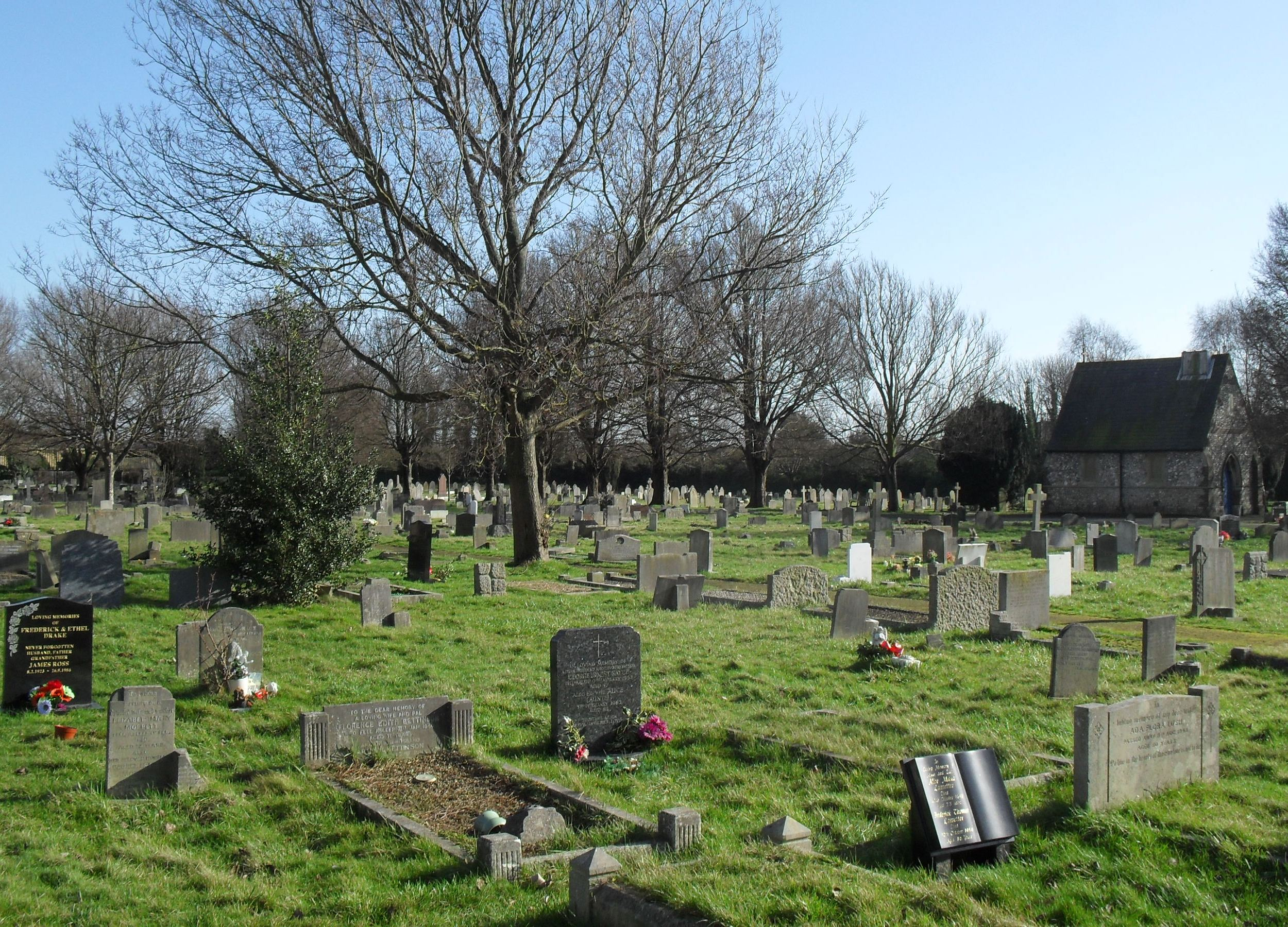
Portslade's cemetery was inaugurated in 1872.

The villages of Hove and Portslade lay to the west of Brighton. Their neighbour's growth and fashionable status, and the opening of a connecting railway line in the mid-19th century, stimulated rapid residential development, and the ancient parish churches of both settlements faced similar problems to Brighton's St Nicholas' Church. The graveyard around St Andrew's Church in Hove had been used since the 1530s, and by the 1850s the authorities realised that more space would be needed. To compound the problem, Hove's other Anglican churches lacked any burial space of their own. (The church of the recently built Brunswick Town estate, also called St Andrew's, had burial vaults, but the Public Health Act 1848 and subsequent Acts of Parliament prevented their further use.) The churchyard at the parish church was extended in 1860, but the Hove Commissioners soon started searching for land for a municipal cemetery. In 1878, they decided to buy 25 acres (10 ha) in the parish of Aldrington, between the railway line and the Old Shoreham Road. A dispute with the Dyke Railway Company, which operated a branch line from the main railway alongside the proposed site, delayed the purchase until October 1879, during which time the land continued to be farmed. The Hove Commissioners paid £8,750 for the site, and 12 acres (4.9 ha) were laid out in 1880 (of which 8 acres (3.2 ha) were consecrated by the Bishop of Chichester on 27 May 1882). The rest of the land continued in agricultural use until the cemetery was gradually extended over the next decades. Hove Borough Council bought more land north of the Old Shoreham Road directly opposite the original cemetery in 1923: the 20.8-acre (8.4 ha) site, on sloping ground, cost £6,450 (£337,000 as of 2025). More land was bought several miles outside the borough in 1955 in case it was needed for more burials, but the 30-acre (12 ha) tree-covered site at Poynings has not been required because cremation has become more popular since the 1950s.

The small churchyard at St Nicolas' Church in Portslade was closed to new burials by 1871, when the Portslade Burial Board was founded. While the board searched for land for a municipal cemetery, the priests in the neighbouring parishes of Hangleton and Aldrington allowed burials of Portslade residents to take place at the parish churches of St Helen and St Leonard respectively. A second Anglican church, St Andrew's, was built in Portslade in 1864, and the Burial Board intended for some adjacent land to be turned into a cemetery. The donor of the site refused this, though, and the board had to seek land elsewhere in the parish. Resident John Hooper Smith sold 4 acres (1.6 ha) for £1,000 (£102,000 as of 2025), and Portslade Cemetery was consecrated on 9 November 1872. An extension was added in 1896 and fully laid out in 1924–25. Some land at the south end of the cemetery, alongside Victoria Road, was controversially sold for housing development in 1936 after several months of debate.

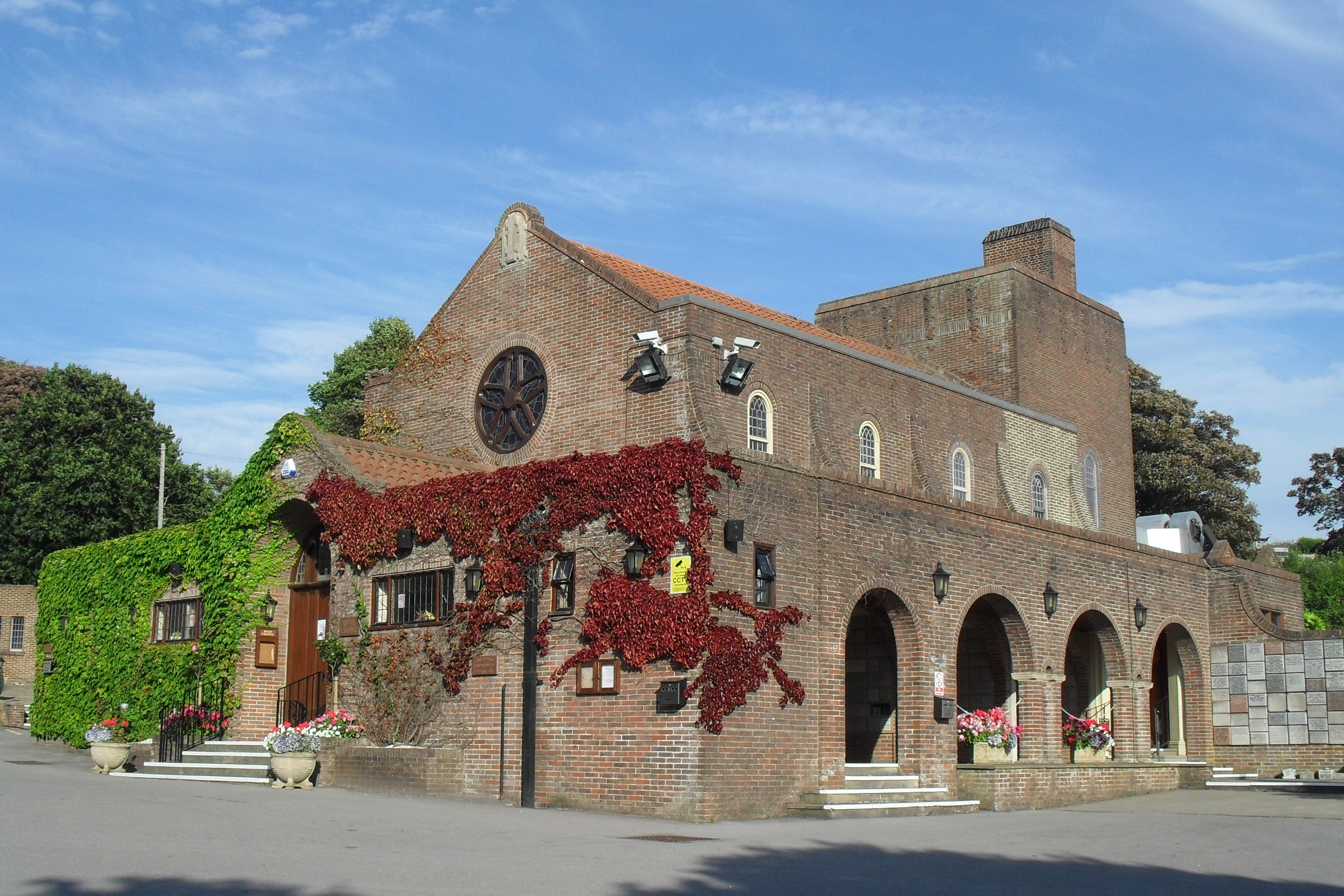
The Downs Crematorium opened in 1941.

Cremation became more socially acceptable in the 20th century, and in 1930 the first crematorium in Sussex opened in one of the twin chapels at Woodvale Cemetery. It was adapted for this purpose by the addition of a chimney and other structural alterations. Originally known as the Brighton Borough Crematorium, it is now called the Woodvale Crematorium. In 1941, another crematorium was opened at the far northeast corner of the Brighton and Preston Cemetery, alongside Bear Road. The Downs Crematorium is privately owned and run.

Brighton's urban area expanded from the late 19th century with a series of boundary extensions, some of which brought surrounding villages and their parish churches into the borough (which was established in 1854). Parts of Preston parish were added in 1873 and 1894, and some of Patcham parish was annexed in 1923. The Brighton Corporation Act 1927, enacted on 1 April 1928, added the parishes of Ovingdean and Rottingdean and parts of Falmer, Patcham and West Blatchington, and Preston parish was absorbed into the borough rather than being separate for ecclesiastical purposes. Rottingdean, Ovingdean, Patcham, West Blatchington and Preston parish churches and their churchyards became part of Brighton at that point. Stanmer and its church were included in 1952. Meanwhile, Hove expanded to take in Aldrington parish and its church in 1894, and achieved borough status in 1898. Hangleton, most of West Blatchington (including St Peter's Church) and part of Preston parishes were added in 1928. In 1974, the parish of Portslade—3½ times larger than the original parish of Hove—became part of Hove Borough. The Boroughs of Brighton and Hove were first united as a unitary authority in 1997, and city status was granted in 2000.

== Churchyards and other religious burial grounds ==
=== St Nicholas' Church and the western extension ===
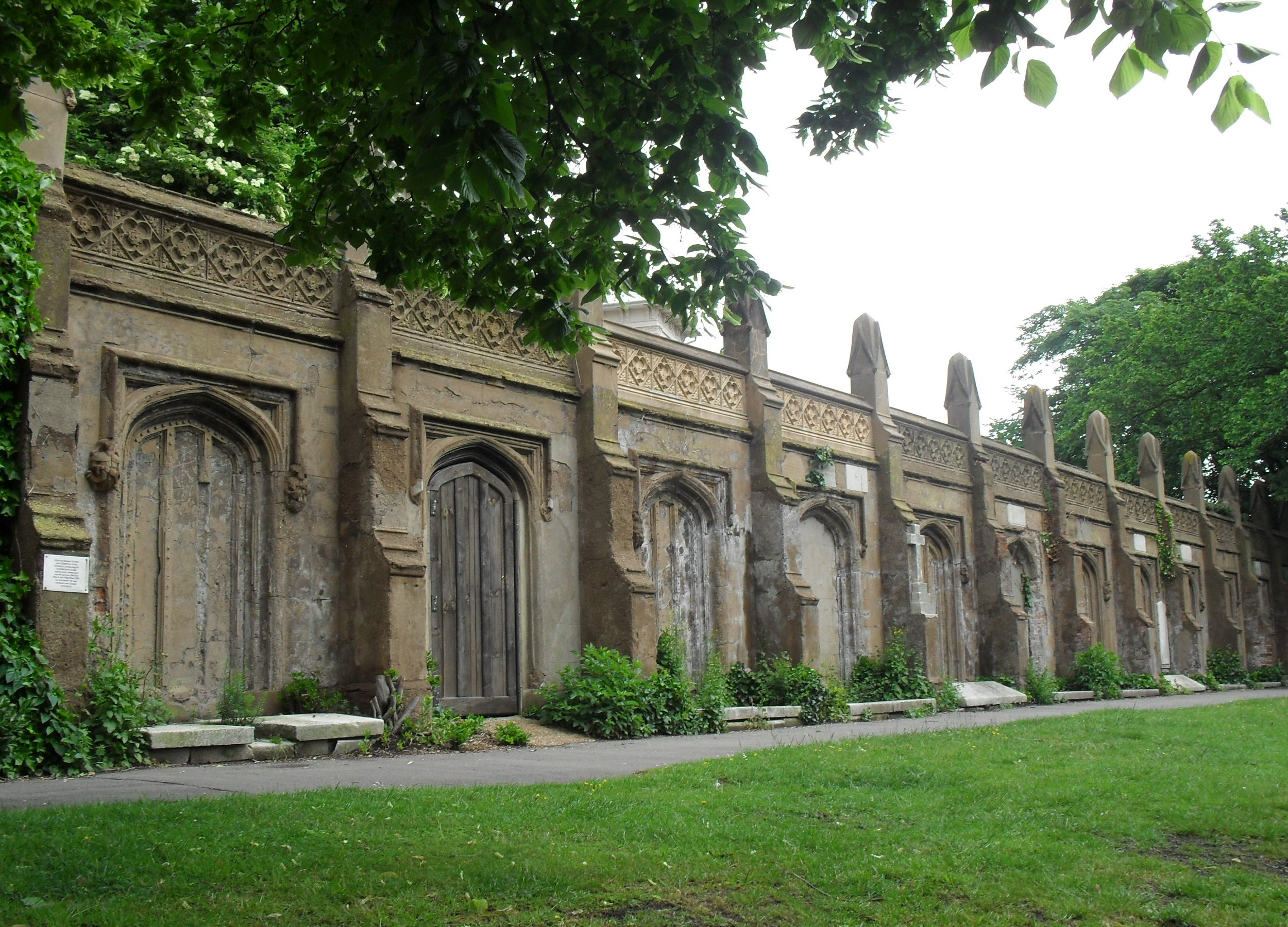
A terrace of burial vaults line the north side of the western extension to the churchyard.

At their greatest extent, the burial grounds around Brighton's parish church covered three separate sites around Church Street and Dyke Road. The small northern extension laid out in 1824 was superseded by the elaborately planned western extension of 1840, designed by prominent local architect Amon Henry Wilds. The lavish plan was based on the Oriental style popular in Brighton since the redesign of the Royal Pavilion in the 1820s. Complaints over the cost meant that the main feature, a stone pyramid in the centre of the site, was not built, but Wilds did provide an arched entrance and a terrace of 14 Tudor-Gothic stone burial vaults with recessed entrances along the north side. They have steps on the east and west sides leading to a walkway across the top of the terrace. There appear to be 14 vaults, but the 14-bay exterior is in fact false: the recessed entrances, with their Tudor-style arched doorways, are blank (with one exception). Separating each bay is a pinnacled buttress. The steps to the east are the more elaborate set: they have stuccoed walls with moulded terracotta panels to the piers. The vaults are built of rubble faced with stucco, and are a Grade II-listed structure— as is the Classical-style entrance archway fronting Dyke Road. It was erected in 1846, and is built mostly of yellow brick with some stonework. The arch has a keystone and is flanked by Doric pilasters topped by a cornice and entablature.

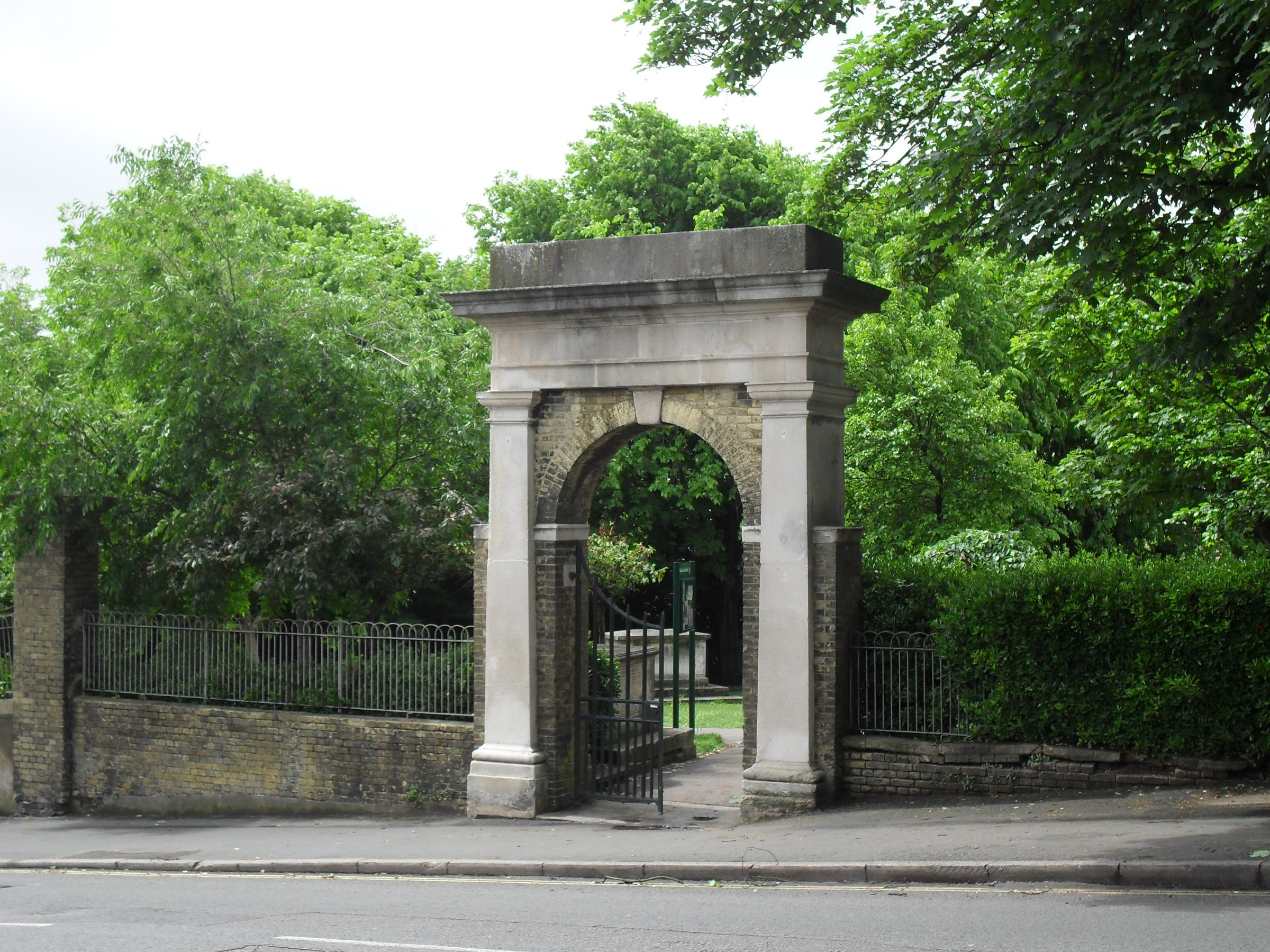
The entrance to the western extension was added in 1846.

Burials no longer take place in any part of St Nicholas' Church grounds. The original graveyard was no longer used after 1853 by order of the Government. It stayed in its mid 19th-century condition for the next century, but became prone to vandalism and increasingly difficult to maintain in the 20th century. Brighton Borough Council decided to move many tombstones and introduce landscaping. The churchyard, now owned by the council and designated as a public open space, is easier to maintain and has good tree cover. The 1824 extension north of Church Street, which like the western extension has an arched entrance, became the responsibility of Brighton Corporation (predecessors of the borough council) when the Brighton Improvement Act 1884 was passed. They converted it into a play area in 1949 and moved the tombstones to the walls. The western extension was also taken over by the Corporation in 1884, and like the original churchyard is maintained by the council as an area of open space called the Dyke Road Garden of Rest. The Great Storm of 1987 damaged all three parts of the churchyard, and the council planted about 90 new trees to replace those lost.

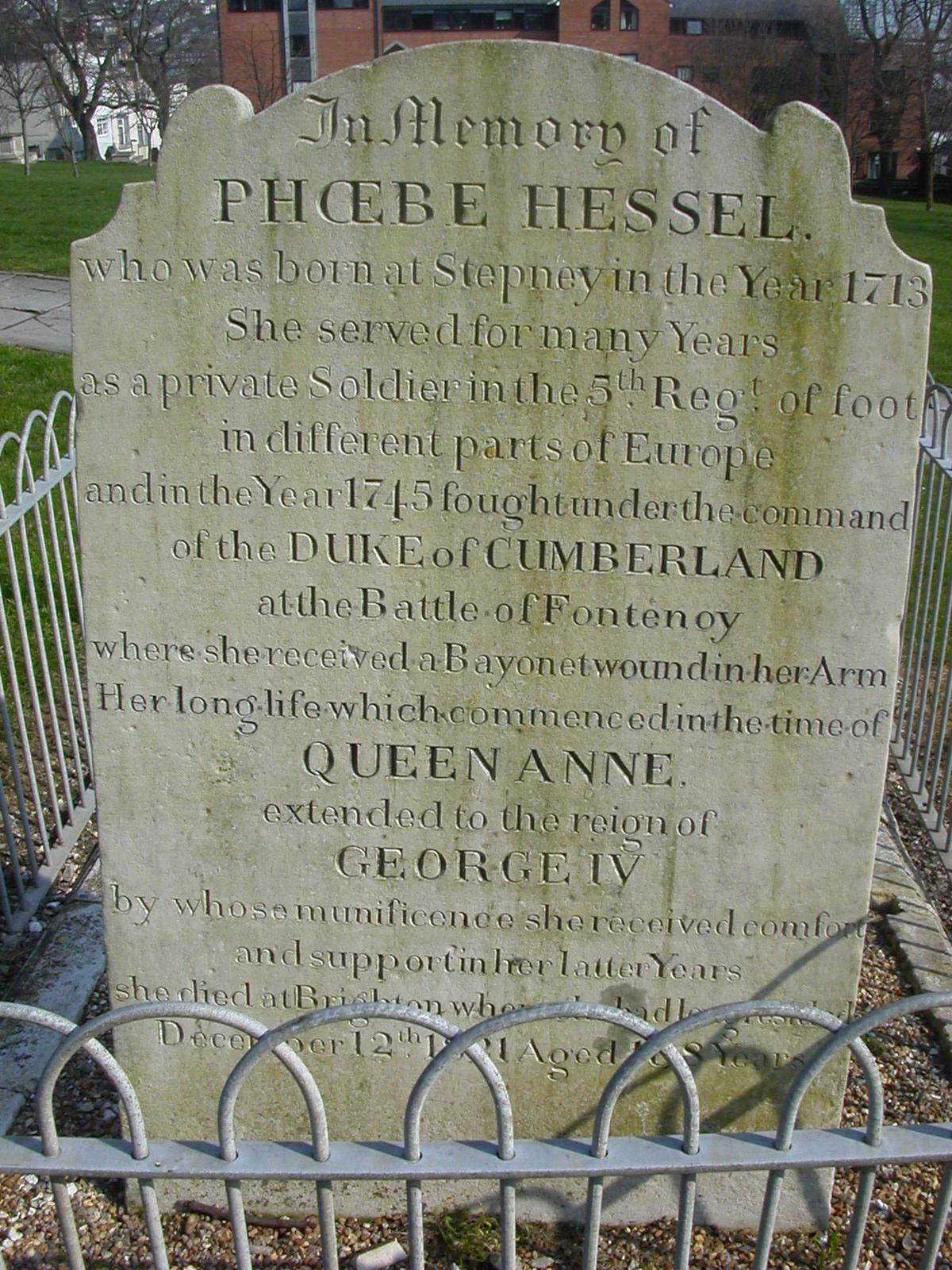
Phoebe Hessel, whose eventful life made her a Brighton celebrity, is buried in this listed tomb.

Many prominent Brighton residents and people associated with the resort are buried at St Nicholas' Church, mostly in the original churchyard. The council maintained the most historically important tombs in their original positions when landscaping the churchyard in the mid-20th century. The oldest surviving tomb is that of Captain Nicholas Tettersell, who helped King Charles II escape to France in 1651 after he fled from the Battle of Worcester. The table-tomb dates from 1674, stands next to the south wall of the church and is a Grade II-listed structure. The lid of the stone-built tomb recounts the story of Tettersell's involvement in the King's escape. Martha Gunn (1726–1815), the "Venerable Priestess of the Bath", was Brighton's most famous and celebrated "dipper" (operator of the bathing machines popular in the resort's early history). The headstone, in the shape of a coffin, is also Grade II-listed and commemorates other members of her family. Actress and singer Anna Maria Crouch has an elaborate, Grade II-listed, Coade stone table tomb with a carved memorial tablet, friezes with foliage patterns and Vitruvian scrolls, putti and a Classical-style urn. Phoebe Hessel (1713–1821) lived to 108, posed as a man and fought as a soldier for 17 years so she could be with her army husband, and later retired to Brighton where she made a living selling goods on a street corner. Aged 79, she helped to apprehend two robbers while drinking at the Red Lion Inn, Shoreham-by-Sea. Put into the workhouse in 1800, she discharged herself at the age of 93, became a local celebrity and received a sizeable pension paid personally by the Prince Regent. Prominent Jewish resident Hyam Lewis paid for her tombstone, a Grade II-listed structure which was later repaired by her army regiment's modern successors. Amon Wilds, father of Amon Henry Wilds and one Brighton's most important architects, is buried in a tomb whose Grade II-listed headstone was designed by his son. It is decorated with Ammonite capitals, one of their favourite architectural motifs. Sake Dean Mahomed (1759–1851), an Indian travel writer and entrepreneur who introduced "shampooing" massages to England when he opened a bath-house in Brighton in 1815—and later provided his services to Kings George IV and William IV—is buried nearby in another Grade II-listed tomb. Dr Swan Downer, a merchant and philanthropist who endowed the Swan Downer School for poor girls, is also buried in the churchyard. His school building at 11 Dyke Road, near the church, survives as a nightclub. In 1984, a memorial stone to actress Dame Flora Robson was placed near the church door. She lived at Wykeham Terrace next to the churchyard. Publisher and author Sir Richard Phillips is buried in the western extension; his tomb is included in English Heritage's Grade II listing of the nearby burial vaults.

=== St Andrew's Church, Hove ===
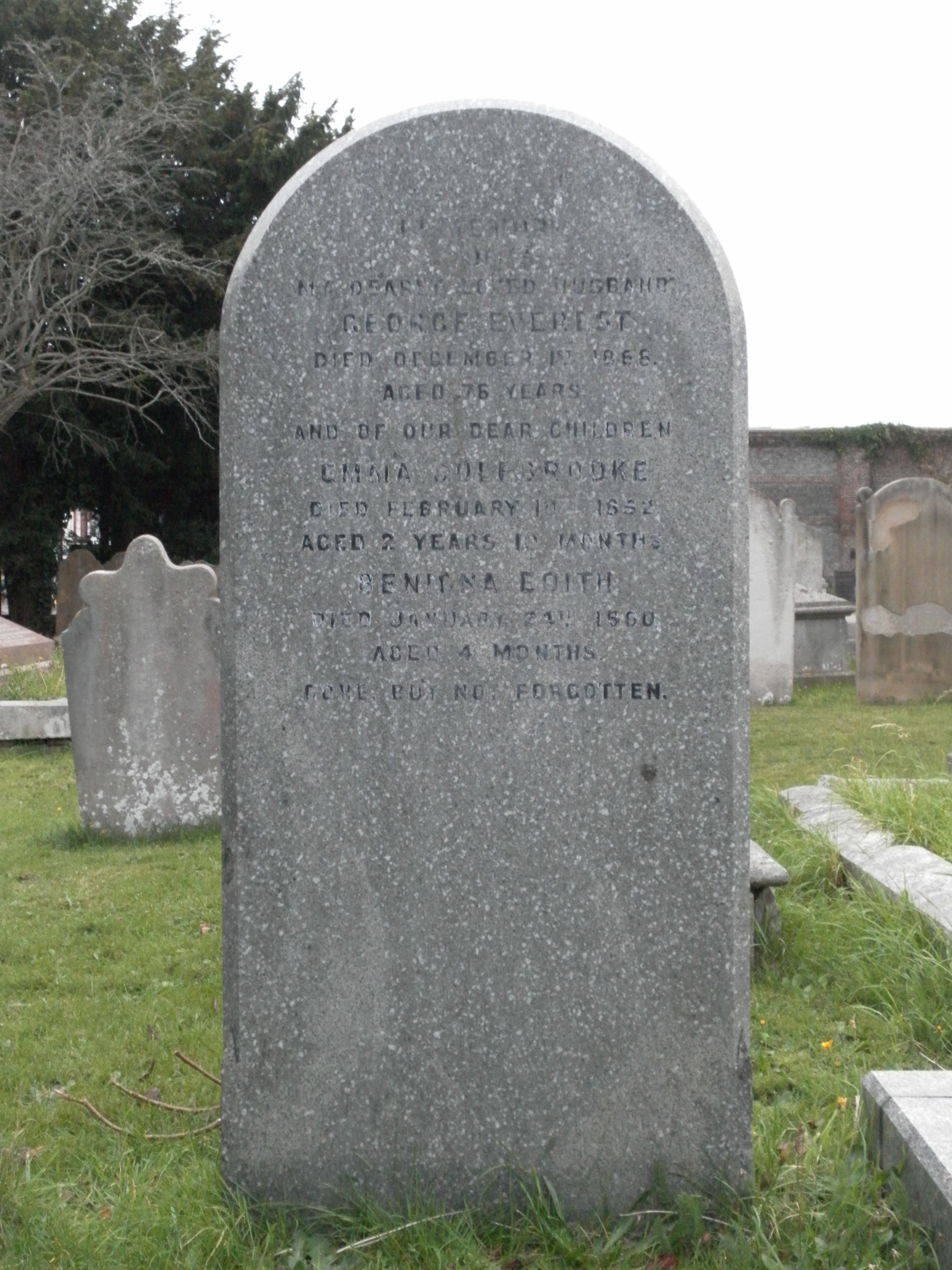
Colonel Sir George Everest is buried in the churchyard at Hove's parish church.

The ancient churchyard around St Andrew's parish church in Hove has been used since the 16th century or earlier, but it fell out of use in 1883 and has been built over in places. Some historic tombs have been damaged or removed in the process, and hundreds of bodies had to be exhumed and reinterred during one period of building work.

The churchyard was already nearly full by 1850, when it acquired local fame after influential theologian, sermon writer and well-known preacher Rev. Frederick William Robertson started visiting and walking there. He remarked "I was pleased to hear not a single human soul far or near ... above there were a few dense clouds, edged with light, sailing across a marvellous blue ... I heard nothing but the sea, falling with a most dissonant, heavy, endless clang upon the shore". At the time the area was much more extensive: graves ran beyond the present south wall on the site of Church Road. The churchyard gained another 3 acres (1.2 ha) in 1858, but even this was filled soon afterwards. Further burials were prohibited from 1883, by which time Hove Cemetery was open. With the churchyard's importance diminished, a controversial plan to reduce its size at the southern end and extend Church Road through it was announced in 1895. Work began in July of that year, and more than 300 bodies were dug up and moved to Hove Cemetery. Many of the gravestones and memorials were destroyed during this work. The northern section became overgrown and unsafe, and in 1972 2.5 acres (1.0 ha) were dug up and built over when a new school was built. As before, many gravestones were destroyed, although the family tomb of Charles Brownlow, 2nd Baron Lurgan and four relatives was saved and re-erected in Hove Cemetery. During the 1980s, a new parish hall was built near the church, and more land was taken from the churchyard. In 2002, a section alongside the north wall was created for the burial of cremated remains.

Burials at St Andrew's Church include influential local architect Charles Busby (whose grave has been destroyed), geographer Colonel Sir George Everest (after whom Mount Everest was named), Rear-Admiral Sir John Hindmarsh kh rn—South Australia's first Governor—Admiral George Westphal, who fought at the Battle of Trafalgar as a midshipman, and members of several important local families. There are also Commonwealth War Graves Commission special memorials to a North Staffordshire Regiment officer of World War I and a Royal Air Force officer of World War II.

=== Other parish churches ===
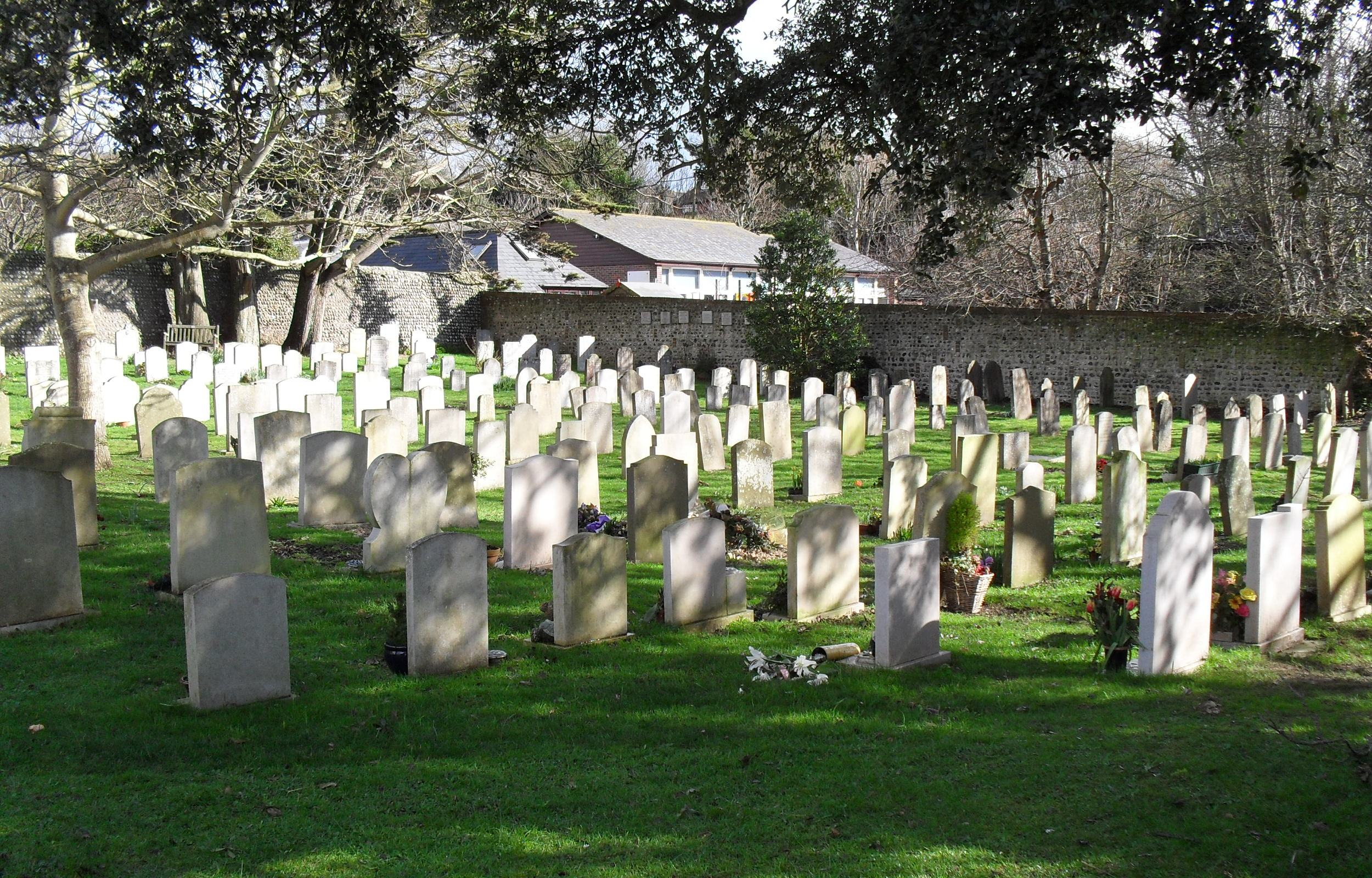
Part of the original vicarage's garden became an extension of the churchyard at St Margaret's Church, Rottingdean.

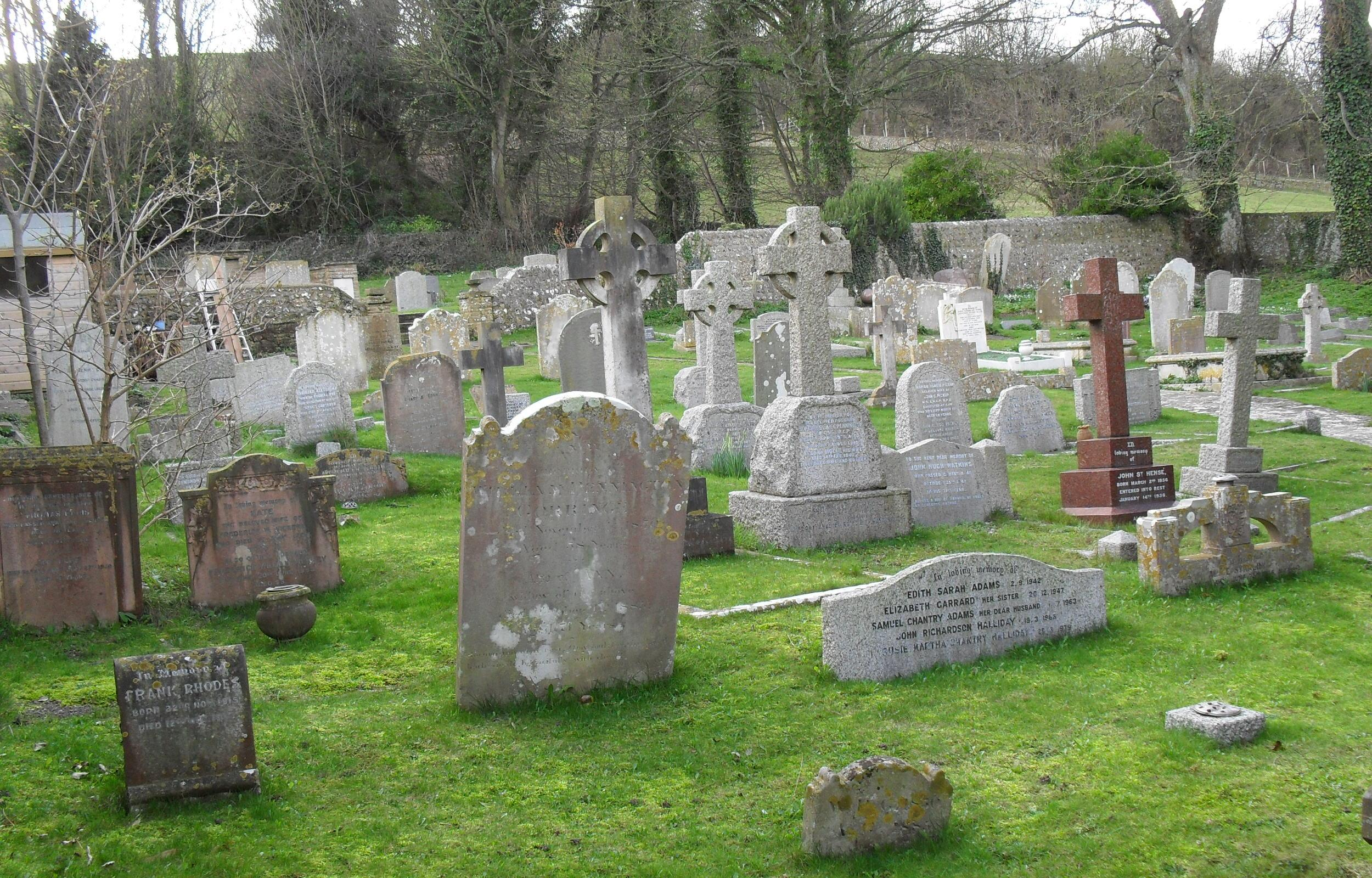
An ancient churchyard surrounds St Wulfran's Church, Ovingdean—a church with Saxon origins.

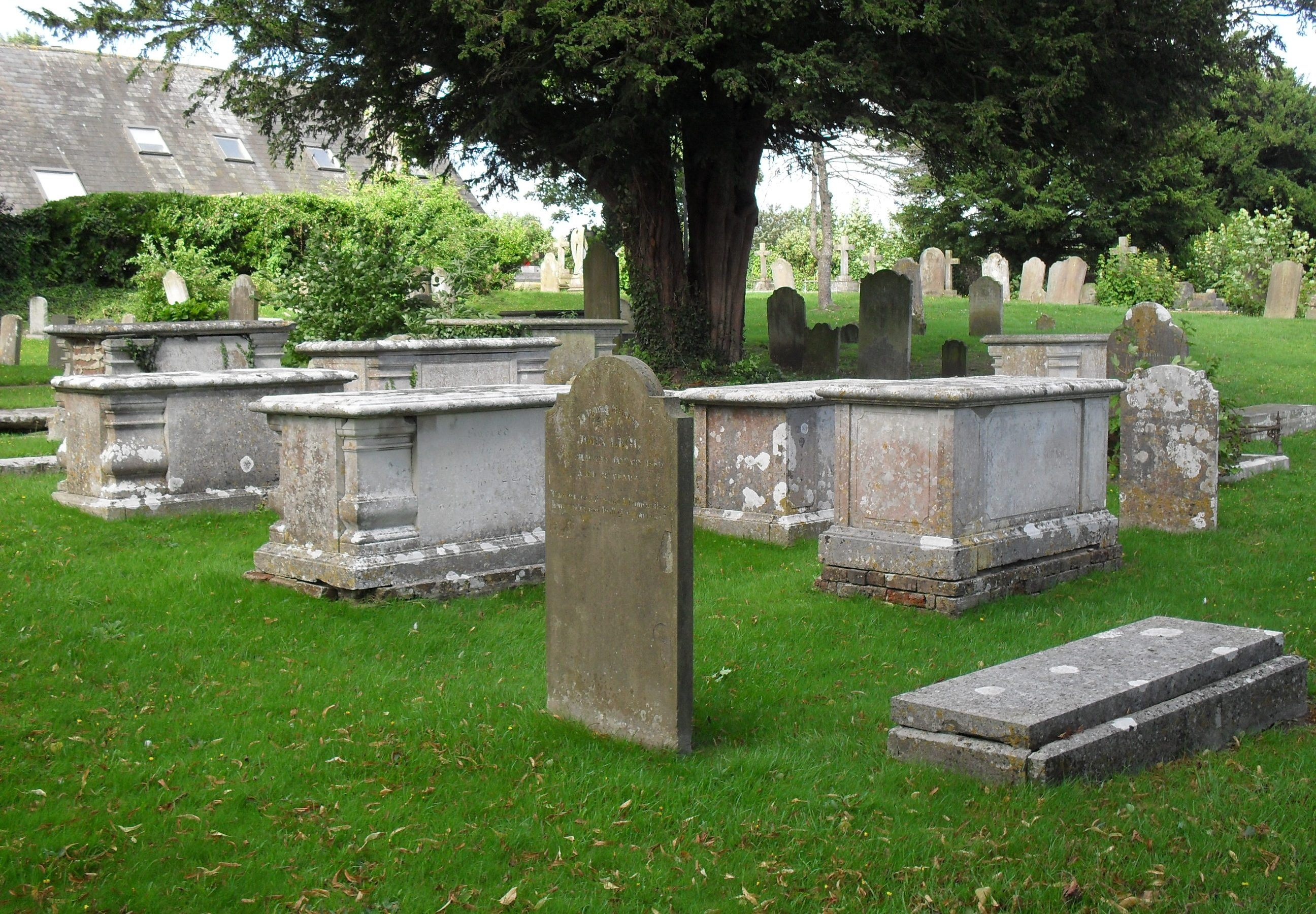
Several tombs at Patcham's All Saints Church are Grade II-listed.

After St Leonard's Church in Aldrington fell into ruin, its old churchyard may have been bought as private land. It was re-established in 1882 by the incumbent vicar. Local archaeologists have stated that an ancient monastery may have occupied the site, and smugglers' underground passages are rumoured to run beneath the land. Burials include the ashes of actor and cricketer Charles Aubrey Smith and both parents of novelist Ivy Compton-Burnett. Three shipwreck victims and a First World War army lieutenant whose aircraft crashed nearby after a mid-air collision are also buried.

St Peter's Church at West Blatchington also became derelict before being rebuilt in the 19th century. In 1636, the churchwarden reported that "our churchyard is not well fenced ... [for] Tyme out of mynde, it hath not been used for a buryall place". The church was reopened in 1891 and the churchyard came back into use, although 140 square yards (120 m^{2}) were given up in 1934 when a road was built.

Hangleton's ancient parish church, St Helen's Church, stands in a high spot on windy, exposed downland, and its scattered tombs and gravestones are badly weathered. Social reformers Rev. Samuel and Dame Henrietta Barnett (founders of Toynbee Hall) are buried there, as is Sir Hildebrand Harmsworth, 1st Baronet of the Harmsworth newspaper publishing dynasty. The most prominent and ostentatious tomb—of black marble with intricate gold mosaic work, by the south door of the church—is that of Edward Kenealy qc. He unsuccessfully defended Sir Roger Tichborne in the Tichborne Case, a famous 19th-century trial which was the longest in British legal history at the time. He later served as Member of Parliament for Stoke-on-Trent until his death in 1880. His public prominence was such that the tomb was paid for by public subscription.

The churchyard at St Margaret's Church in Rottingdean "still largely retains its village character", and has been extended several times in the 19th and 20th centuries as the settlement has expanded and become part of the wider urban area. An old tithe barn was removed from a field in 1883 to make way for the first extension, to the northwest of the original churchyard. The Marquess of Abergavenny, the main landowner in the area, gave up some of his land in 1905 and 1920 to allow expansion to the northeast; the land used in 1920 had been part of the garden of the original vicarage (a private house by that time). The garden of another private house became part of the churchyard in 1955, although it has been left as a lawn and is not used for burials: Edwin Jukes, owner of Norton House, donated the land, which is surrounded by a wall. Burials in the churchyard include Edward Burne-Jones, his wife Georgiana (née MacDonald), their author granddaughter Angela Thirkell, the music hall actor G. H. Elliott, and the world renowned blues guitarist Gary Moore (died 2011). Thirkell's grave-marker is an unusual wooden board—a style popular in the 18th century but rarely seen on modern graves. The churchyard contains 14 Commonwealth war graves of nine British service personnel of World War I (including one unidentified merchant seaman) and four of World War II.

Stanmer Church (now redundant) has been associated with the Earls of Chichester (Pelham Baronetcy) for more than 300 years. They owned Stanmer House, the single-street estate village of Stanmer, the extensive park and woodland, and the church. Many Pelhams are buried in the churchyard. Two yew trees among the graves survive from the time of the original medieval church, and the churchyard also has a Grade II-listed flint-built wellhouse with a donkey-wheel for drawing water from the ground.

St Nicolas' Church at Portslade is described as having "one of the most tranquil and best maintained churchyards in Brighton or Hove." For such a large and populous parish (Portslade was more important than neighbouring Hove for much of its history), it covers a small area; bodies appear to have been buried on top of each other in several places, especially near the chancel where the ground rises substantially. In its earliest days the churchyard was fenced rather than walled; the present flint walls apparently date from the 17th century. Several prominent local families have large and elaborate memorials and vaults: the Georgian-style Buckoll family gravestones near the church porch are "one of the chief glories".

St Wulfran's Church, Ovingdean—Brighton and Hove's oldest building, in the mostly rural village of Ovingdean—is surrounded by a sloping churchyard on three sides. No trace of the original Saxon church remains, but a 1,000-year-old yew tree stands among the graves near the porch. Burials include local inventor Magnus Volk and women's rights campaigner and University of Sussex benefactor Helena Normanton. The tombs of the Kemp and Jex-Blake families are also present. Charles Eamer Kempe and Nathaniel Kemp are buried in the Grade II-listed Kemp tomb, and Thomas Read Kemp (founder of Kemp Town) is commemorated. Master builder and Daylight Saving Time pioneer William Willett, who is buried at Chislehurst, is commemorated on a family memorial in the churchyard.

Ancient tombs in the extensive churchyard at All Saints Church, Patcham include several for members of the locally influential Scrase family, who were also associated with St Peter's Church at West Blatchington. They are Grade II-listed in a joint listing with some unrelated 18th- and 19th-century tombs nearby.

=== Hanover Chapel burial ground ===
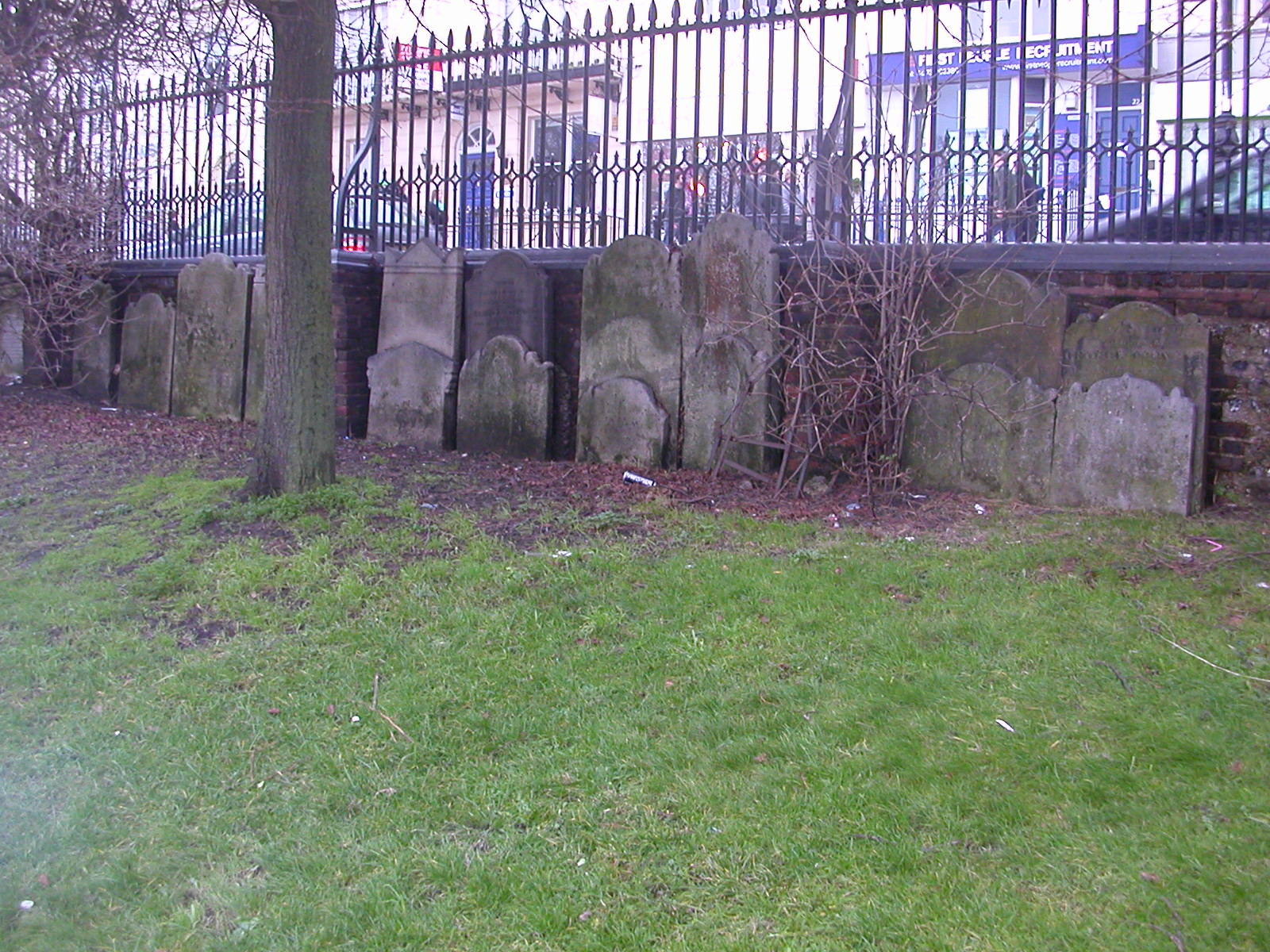
Gravestones in the former burial ground now line the walls of the former Hanover Chapel burial ground.

Hanover Chapel was founded in 1825 as an Independent place of worship, and was acquired by the Presbyterian Church of England in 1844. It stood on the south side of North Road, and the high-density slum areas of Durham and Petty France developed around it after Brighton railway station was opened nearby in 1840. The chapel had a large burial ground on the south side, which was built on the site of the local barracks hospital. In 1845, the Brighton Town Commissioners demolished many of the slums and some gardens to make way for Queen's Road, a direct route from the station to the seafront. The road took land on the west side of the burial ground, although its western boundary wall survives as a raised pavement.

Brighton Corporation (the successors to the Town Commissioners) took responsibility for many open spaces in the town, including the Hanover Chapel burial ground, after the 1884 Brighton Improvement Act was passed. It was maintained as a graveyard until 1949, when it was redesigned as the Queen's Road Rest Garden; this involved digging up the gravestones and placing them around the walls instead. Since 1989, it has been entered through a gateway in Queen's Road; the Brighthelm Centre and United Reformed Church was built next to the old chapel in 1987.

The chapel had a crypt, which served as a wartime air-raid shelter among other uses. In 1981, a set of chambers was discovered; they contained hundreds of coffins and bodies from the early 19th century. Other chambers excavated during 1982 had a mixture of timber and lead-lined coffins, many without plaques or identifying marks and some stored in groups. The remains were photographed and recorded, and details were held at the lodge house of Woodvale Cemetery.

=== Quaker burial grounds, old and new ===
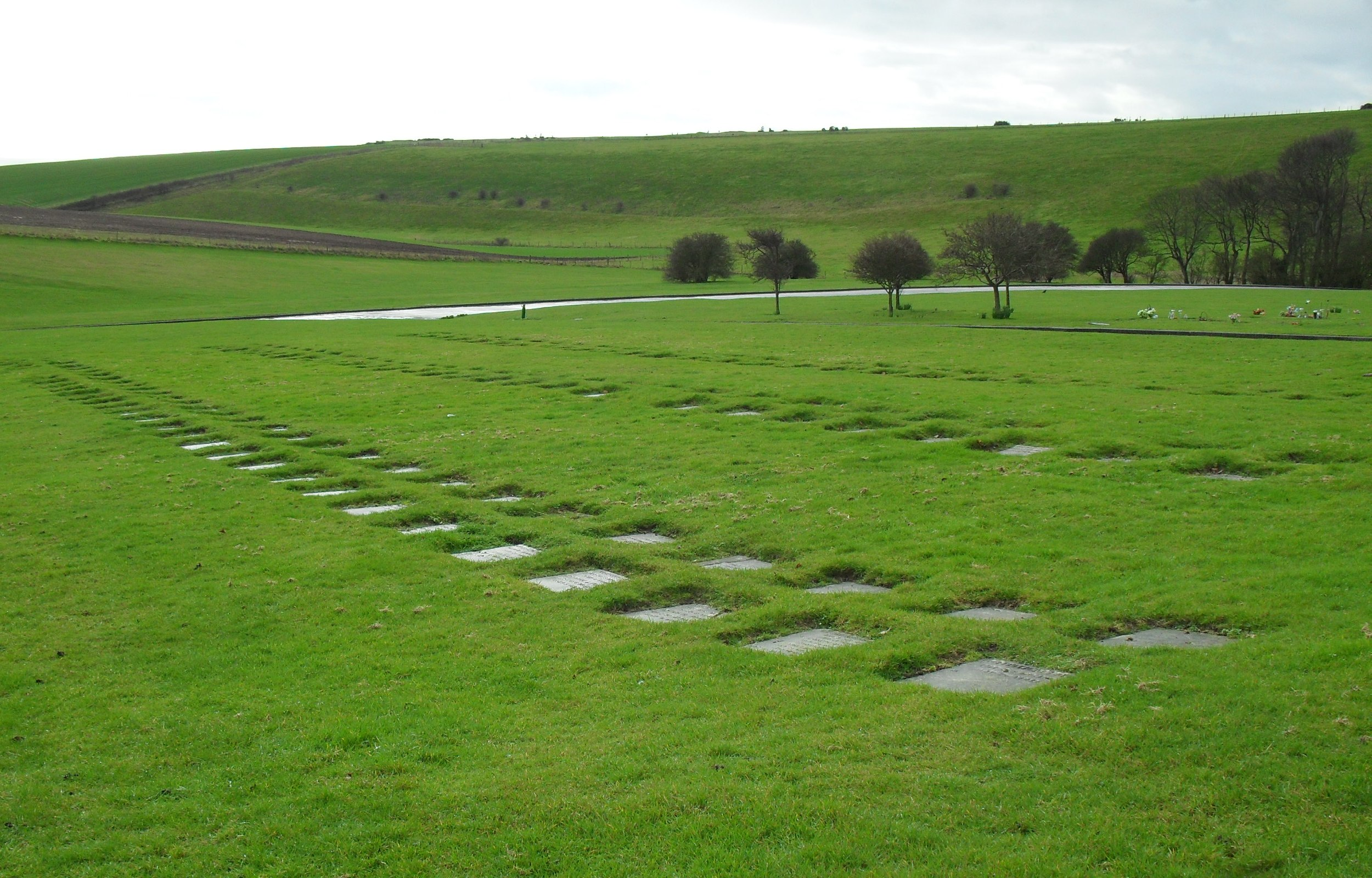
The remains of more than 300 Quakers were reinterred at the Lawn Memorial Cemetery in Woodingdean in 1972.

Quakers worshipped in Brighton from 1690, when they bought a former malthouse near the site of the present Pavilion Theatre in the North Laine. Empty land next to this, extending to about 1 acre (0.4 ha), became a burial ground. After selling both the building and the burial ground (the latter to the Prince Regent), they moved to a new meeting house in Ship Street in 1805. This had a graveyard, but Prince Albert Street was built across it in 1838, significantly reducing its size.

The community acquired about 4,900 square feet (460 m^{2}) of land at Black Rock—a clifftop area east of Brighton, then in the parish of Rottingdean—in 1855 and established a new graveyard there. The first burial took place in July of that year. The site was a narrow strip of land alongside Rifle Butt Road. Burials continued until September 1971, by which time 311 men, women and children were interred; but in 1972, Brighton Corporation (forerunners of the present Brighton and Hove City Council) placed a compulsory purchase order on the land. The Brighton Marina development below the cliffs at Black Rock had been approved, and the site was needed for construction of a link road. The remains of every body were exhumed, names were recorded and stored at Brighton History Centre, and some headstones were retained. The Corporation dug a communal grave at the Lawn Memorial Park cemetery at Woodingdean, reinterred the remains there and laid out the surviving headstones. New Quaker burials take place in this section of the cemetery.

=== Jewish burial grounds, old and new ===
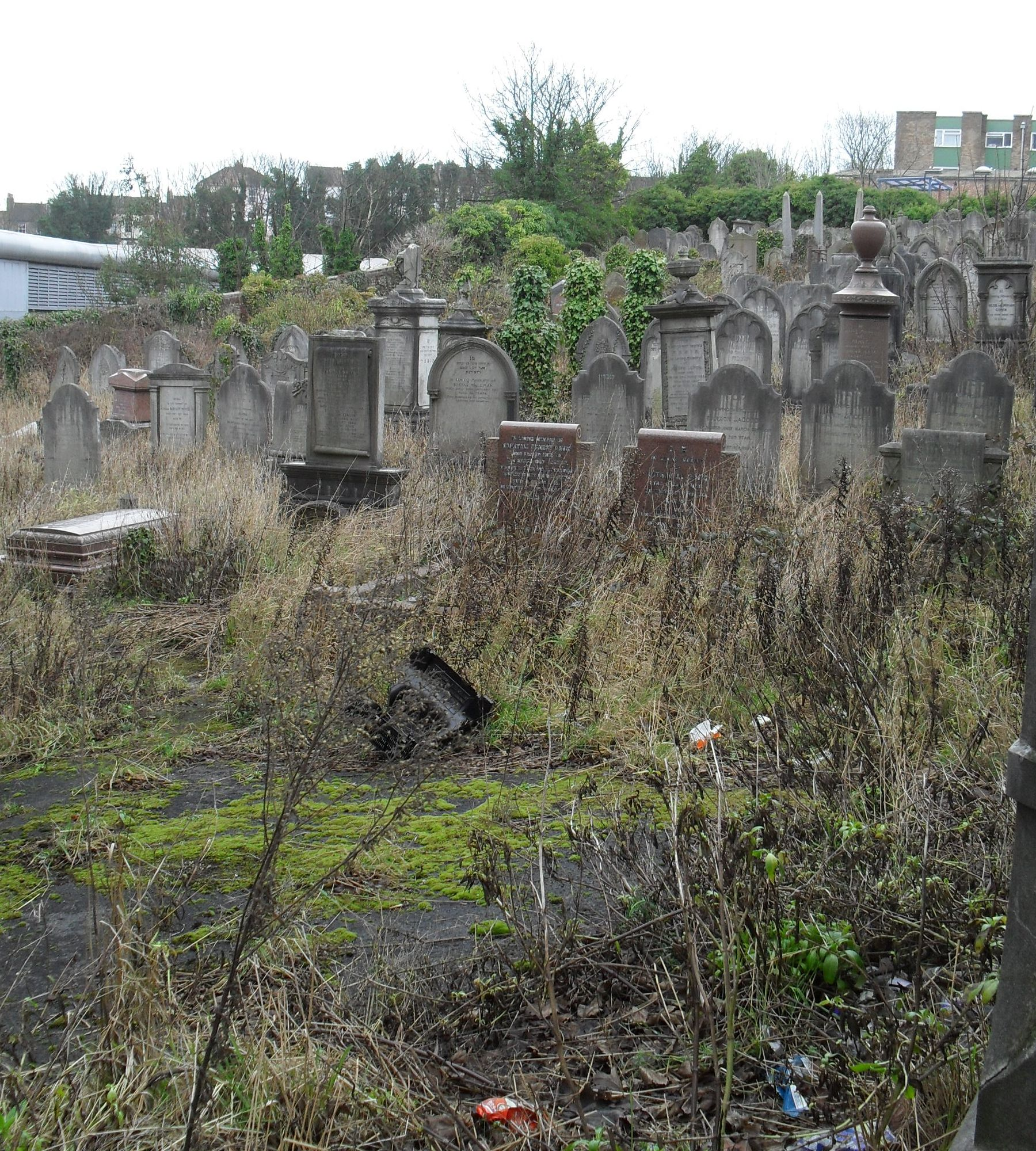
The original Jewish cemetery at Round Hill is now rubbish-strewn and overgrown.

Brighton had Jewish residents by 1766, and the first synagogue was opened in 1792. In 1826, Thomas Read Kemp—property developer, major landowner, Member of Parliament and occasional preacher—sold some of his land for £100 to the congregation of Brighton Synagogue. The 10,686 square feet (993 m^{2}) site on the east side of the Ditchling Road was part of his large landholding on Round Hill, an agricultural area which later became an inner suburb of Brighton. An octagonal brick cemetery chapel (the Ohel), designed by the firm of Thomas Lainson and Son, and now Grade ll listed, was built in the burial ground in 1893. In accordance with Jewish custom, it had facilities for mourners to wash their hands upon leaving the "presence of death". Money to build the chapel and a fence round the cemetery was raised in the 1890s by charging members of the Middle Street Synagogue two shillings per week for a year; some prominent members of Brighton's Jewish community provided interest-free loans as well.

The cemetery has been full for many years and is now closed except for family burials where a tomb already exists. It is locked and having been poor condition with many graves are overgrown, the synagogue now has an annual programme of maintenance. The foundation stone commemorating Kemp's sale of the land survives, though. The cemetery chapel and its surrounding walls and gates were made Grade II listed buildings in 1999. Designed in 1893 by Lainson and Son and built by the Garrett building firm, the chapel is a red-brick octagonal structure in the Queen Anne style, with a tiled turreted roof and corbel-topped piers at each corner, a pedimented entrance and arched windows set below recessed panels. The walls, stucco-faced gate piers and wrought iron fences surrounding the burial ground were built around the same time as the chapel.

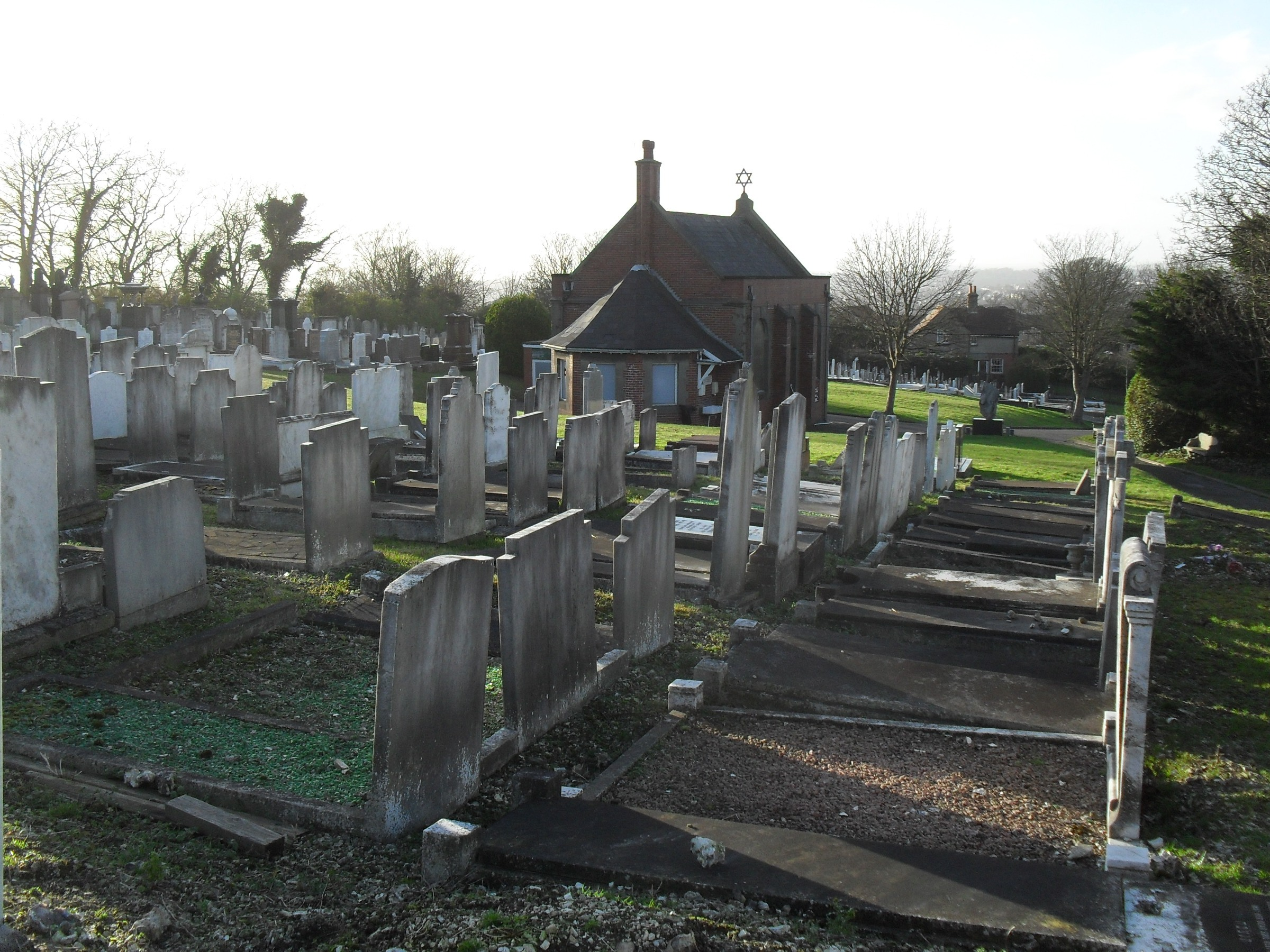
Meadowview Jewish Cemetery, opened in 1919, has its own chapel.

Brighton and Hove have had many prominent Jewish citizens, and several are buried in the old cemetery. Henry Solomon, originally a London watchmaker, was Brighton Borough's chief constable and one of the most prominent public figures in 19th-century Brighton. He was murdered by a thief on 13 March 1844, and was buried two days later in the cemetery. About 10,000 people watched his funeral cortège pass. Hyam Lewis, originally a swordsmith, became a Brighton Town Commissioner in 1813; he was the first Jew in England to hold such a high-ranking municipal position, and he served in several areas of civic life. Levi Emanuel Cohen, Solomon's brother-in-law, was a teacher who founded and edited the radical Brighton Guardian newspaper. He also helped Brighton achieve borough status. Engineer Sir John Howard was noted for his philanthropy; he founded and paid for a series of houses at Roedean for retired nurses.

The cemetery contains a memorial to 2nd Lieutenant Arthur Sampson Marks of the Royal Sussex Regiment (died 1918). He is interred in the Community Cemetery at Wimereux in France.

The old cemetery fell out of use in the early 20th century. In 1919, 3.5 acres (1.4 ha) of the Bear Road (City) Cemetery was walled off and enclosed as a new burial ground for Jews. The Meadowview Jewish Cemetery, sometimes known as the Old Hebrew Burial Ground (reflecting the fact it was extended later), is reached from a path off Bevendean Road. Some of the older tombs are topped with black marble urns. The burial ground was extended in 1978 by the addition of a 1.5-acre (0.61 ha) section to the northeast. and there is a chapel and a Holocaust memorial, which has been described as "impressive and moving". Brighton and Hove City Council own and manage the 1.5-acre (0.61 ha) cemetery extension, which remains open for new burials. Burial rights are held by the Brighton and Hove Hebrew Congregation, which owns the Middle Street Synagogue and another at New Church Road in Hove. This cemetery has four World War II Commonwealth war graves.

== Cemeteries and crematoria ==
=== Brighton Extra Mural Cemetery ===
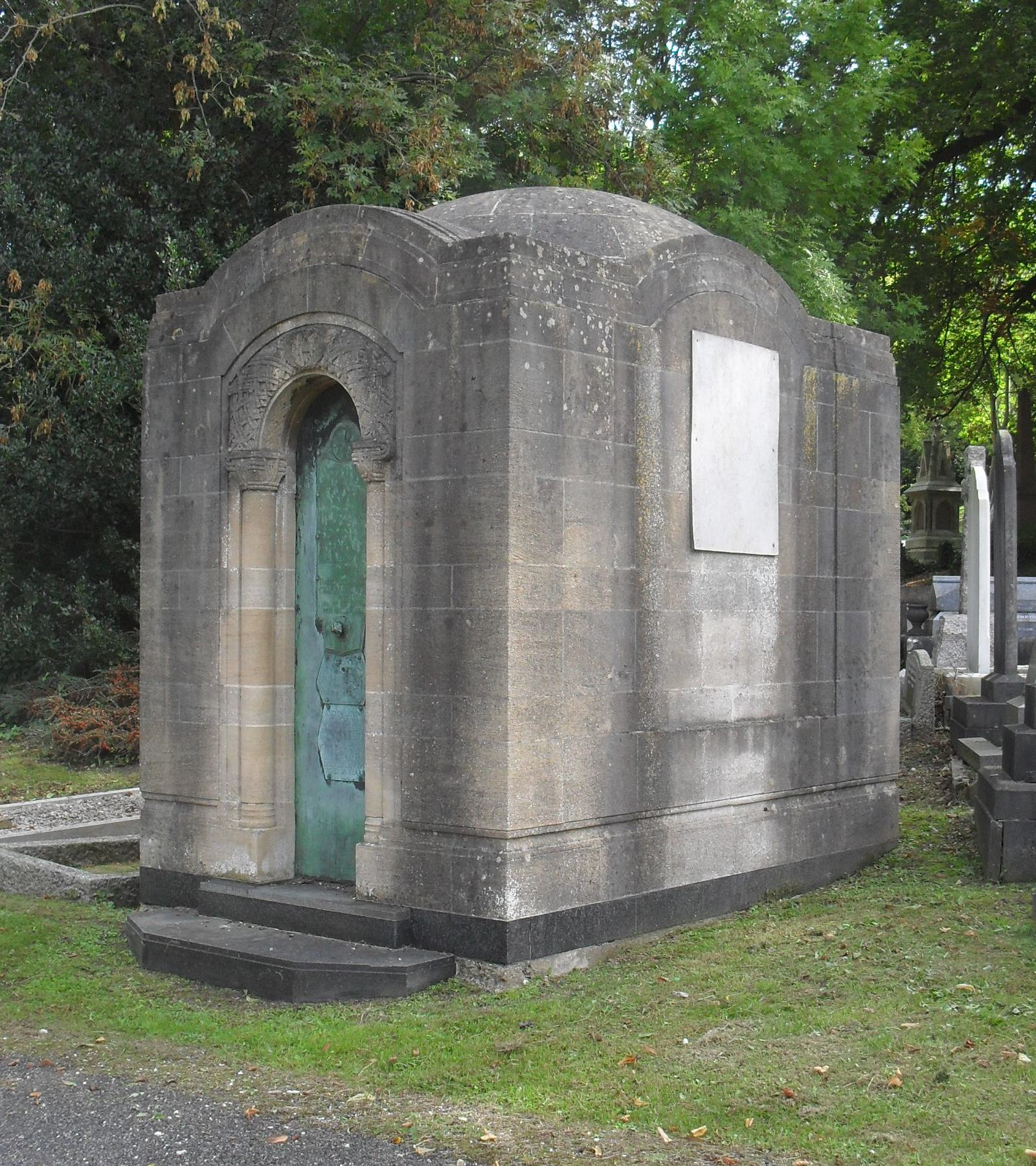
The Grade II-listed Baldwin family tomb takes the form of a Byzantine Revival mausoleum.

The Extra Mural Cemetery occupies "one of the most delightful spots in the whole of Brighton": a sheltered, gently sloping, well wooded area of downland between two much steeper hills. It is still "one of the most pleasant and quiet places in Brighton in which to take a walk", and this quality was noticed as early as 1880, when J.G. Bishop published a walking guide called Strolls in the Brighton Extra Mural Cemetery. The 16.5-acre (6.7 ha) site is now maintained by Brighton and Hove City Council, and although burials can no longer be made, the surviving cemetery chapel is still available for funeral services. The council and its predecessors have maintained the cemetery and its tombs since 1956, landscaping the grounds, ensuring structural safety and preserving the character of the area. In contrast to many municipal cemeteries in England, it is considered to be "an object lesson in how [a cemetery] should be treated". The Brighton Extra Mural Company had been wound up in the 1950s, and its directors asked the council to take responsibility for a perpetual fund it kept for maintenance and improvement. The council took ownership of the cemetery and decided to administer it together with the neighbouring Woodvale Cemetery and Crematorium.

Amon Henry Wilds, one of the founders of the Extra Mural Cemetery Company, designed the landscaping and pathways through the cemetery. He is also credited with designing and building the two chapels, of which only one survives; but by the time the cemetery opened in 1851 Wilds had effectively finished his architectural career (he died in 1857), and the Gothic Revival style of the chapels was uncharacteristic of his standard Classical and Greek Revival works.

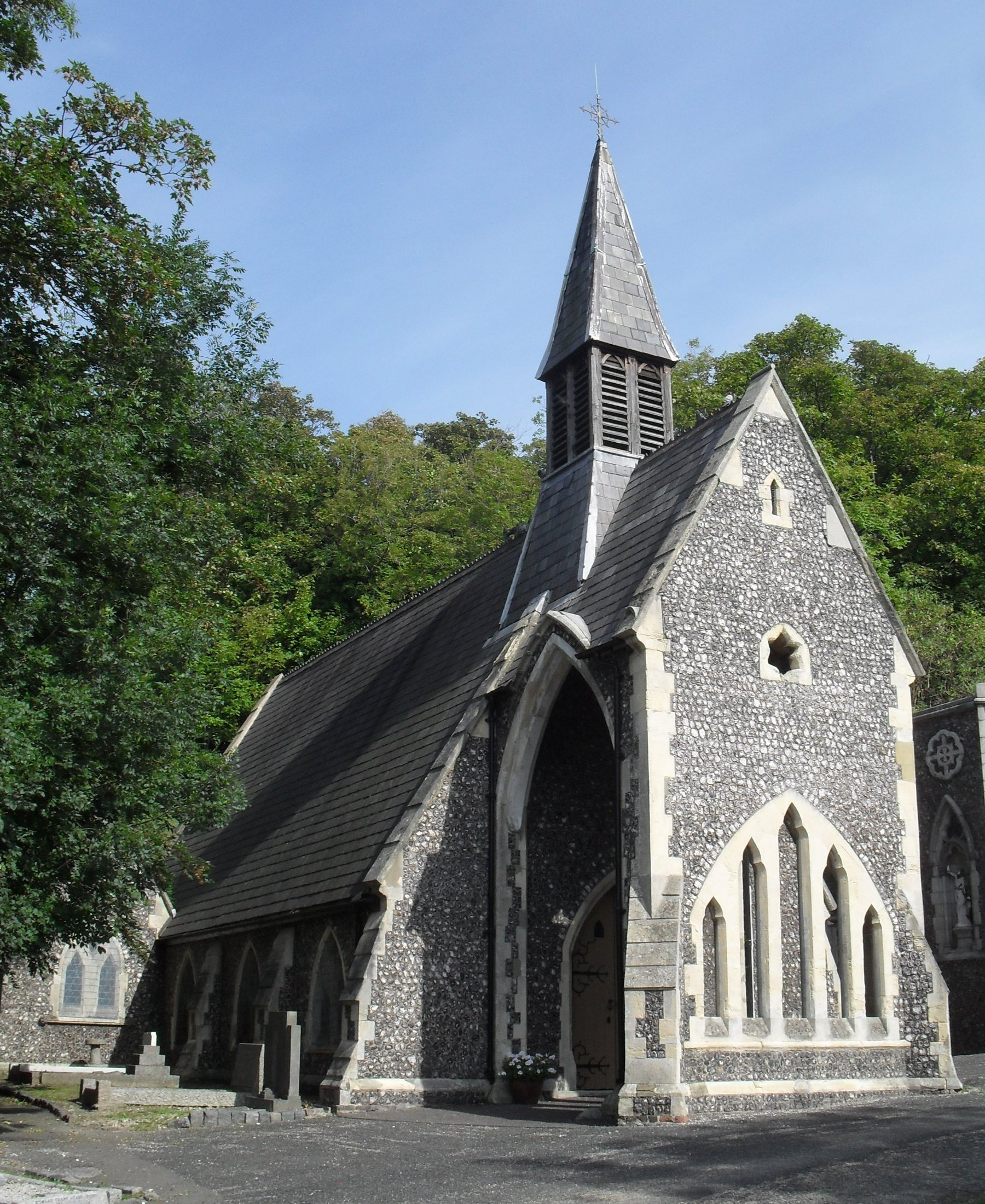
The Gothic Revival chapel at the cemetery is attributed to Amon Henry Wilds—an architect who did not typically work in that style.

The Anglican chapel survives in the northern part of the cemetery; it is an expansive building of knapped flint in the Gothic Revival style. Bath Stone was used in places as well. The plan consists of a chancel and nave without separation, a vestry, a tall stone porte-cochère and a wooden belfry with a spire on top of a slate roof. At the liturgical east end, there is a lancet window with tracery in its four panes, and the vestry has a similar window with three lights. The porte-cochère has a low five-light window with stepped lancets and two smaller windows above. It is buttressed at the corners and has a pointed-arched entrance. Original fittings inside include stained glass windows, reredos, wooden panelling and encaustic tiling to the floor. The chapel is protected as a Grade II listed building. The other chapel, now demolished, was for Nonconformists; it stood to the southwest and had a narrow spire. Nonconformist and Roman Catholic burials were carried out in separately consecrated parts of the cemetery around this chapel. Another demolished building associated with the cemetery was a large Gothic Revival flint-walled gateway with a castellated turret. It apparently dated from the late 19th century, and was pierced by a wide carriage arch. There were rooms above this, then the round turret. The council mortuary building opened in August 1962 on the same site.

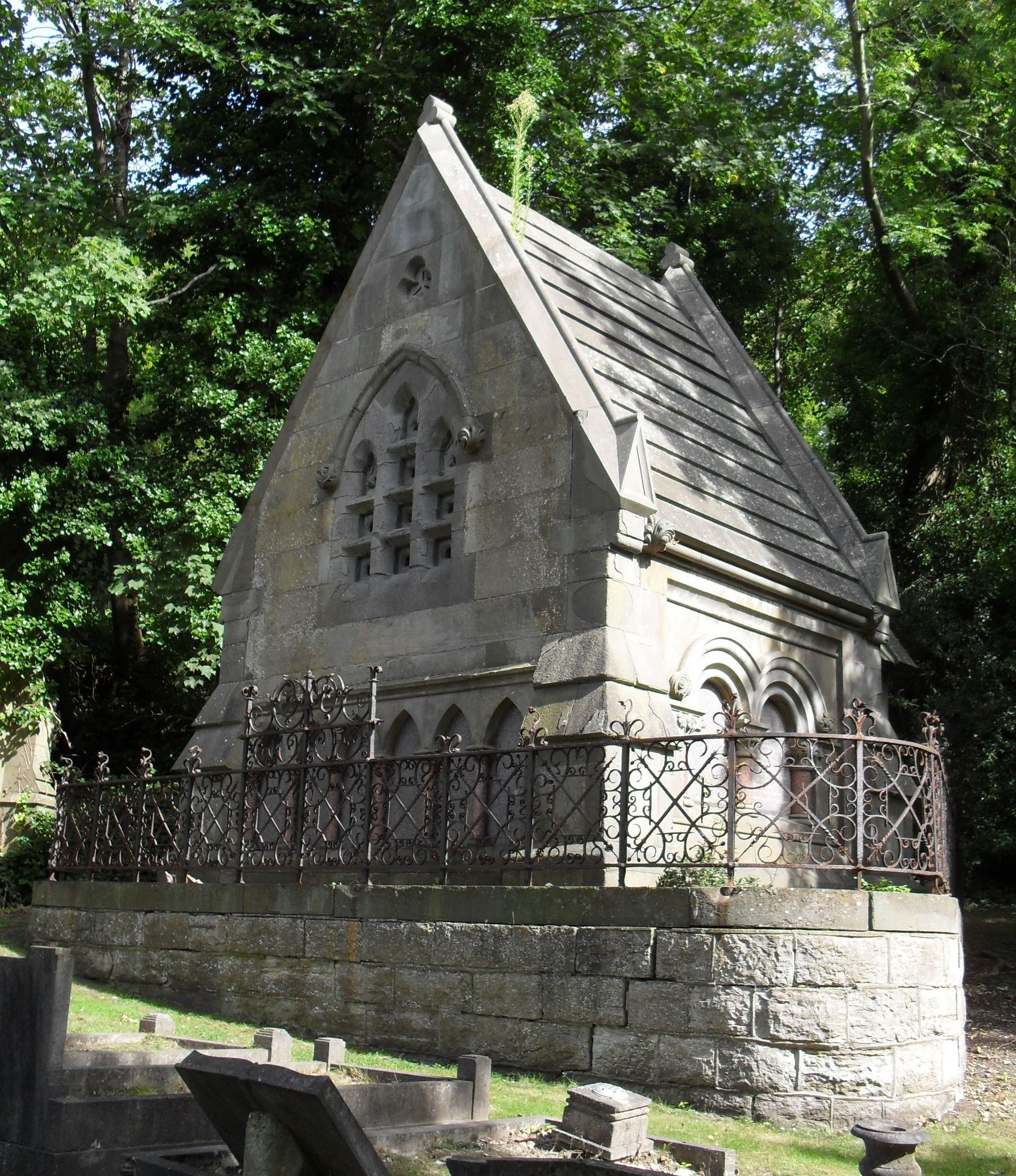
The Ford family have a columbarium-style gabled tomb.

There have been about 145,000 funerals at the cemetery since burials began in 1851. It opened at the height of the Victorian era, when people "made a cult of death" and favoured large funerals and substantial, ornate tombs; and many famous and important Brightonians were buried there. Six tombs are listed by English Heritage for their architectural and historical interest. A single listing covers three tombs standing next to each other in the northwest part of the cemetery. One, in the Greek Revival style, contains an unknown interment. A large Gothic Revival Portland stone and marble mausoleum with granite columns and carved spandrels, resembling a dovecote, holds the remains of John Collingwood, who died in 1861. Rev. Frederick William Robertson, the acclaimed theologian and preacher who held the perpetual curacy of Brighton's Holy Trinity Church and enjoyed walking in the churchyard at Hove, was buried in the third tomb when he died aged 37 in 1853. His tomb is an Egyptian-style pylon with bronze motifs donated by the congregation at Holy Trinity Church and the Brighton Mechanics Institution, which he founded. Further to the east, the Baldwin family memorial, also Grade II-listed, dates from the 1930s. John Leopold Denman, a prolific local architect who specialised in commercial buildings, executed the curious cruciform design with a domed top and stone walls. It has a cornice interrupted by rounded mouldings, an arched entrance flanked by columns with decorative capitals and a recessed bronze door. The Ford family's Gothic Revival mausoleum, another Grade II-listed structure, dates from 1889 and resembles a columbarium with its steep gabled roof and multiple openings. It is of stone with pink granite columns and a base surrounded with iron railings. Members of another local family, the Rays, are buried in "the grandest memorial in the cemetery"—a giant mausoleum which is nearly attached to the chapel. It is a granite and flint structure built into the hill behind, with an arched entrance, carved panels, buttresses, Classical-style decorations and hood moulds. There is space for 42 burials.

Other burials include Rev. John Nelson Goulty and John Cordy Burrows, the two main promoters of the Extra Mural Cemetery Company. Cordy Burrows's tomb is a flat plinth of grey marble with an iron chain around it; Goulty, minister at the Nonconformist Union Chapel, has an obelisk-style memorial in the unconsecrated southwest section. Smith Hannington, founder of the Brighton department store which bore his surname for nearly 200 years until its closure in 2001, has a stone table-tomb near the Ray mausoleum. Thomas Cooper, an architect who designed the Bedford Hotel and Brighton Town Hall, laid out Queen's Road (the direct route from Brighton railway station to the town centre) and served as a Town Commissioner, is buried in a low tomb in the northwest part of the cemetery, which has been left as an unmaintained natural landscape. John Urpeth Rastrick's huge stone tomb, the cemetery's largest at 50 feet (15 m) long and 10 feet (3.0 m) tall, was pulled into the cemetery by 20 horses, and was so wide that a wall had to be removed to let it in. Rastrick was a civil engineer and pioneering railway designer who laid out the Brighton Main Line, including the spectacular Ouse Valley Viaduct. Dr William Russ Pugh, an English doctor who emigrated to Australia and pioneered general anaesthesia there before returning to Brighton, is buried in a Gothic-arcaded tomb nearby. J.A. Erredge, the first to write a history of Brighton, and the Royal Pavilion's first manager and curator Francis De Val (who helped to recover many original fixtures from Kensington Palace, where they had been taken), also have tombs nearby. James Knowles kcvo, an architect who laid out much of the West Brighton estate in Hove and later became a successful journalist and founder of the Metaphysical Society, has a memorial stone on the wall dividing the Extra Mural and Woodvale Cemeteries. Daniel Folkard, a 19th-century churchwarden at St Nicholas' Church and holder of many high-ranking civic positions in Brighton, is buried just off the cemetery's central pathway. His chief antagonist in the Vestry, the curiously named Lt-Col. Thomas Trusty Trickey—who opposed the Vicar of Brighton Rev. Henry Michell Wagner's Ritualist Anglo-Catholic practices and Folkard's support of him—has a grave close by. General Sir Charles Cameron Shute, who besides his military career served as MP for Brighton in 1874-1880, is buried here. Two other Victorian burials, this time commemorating ordinary citizens, have gained attention because of their apt positioning: a Mr. Robert Bacon was found to be buried next to a Mrs. Florence Egg.

The cemetery contains the war graves of 39 Commonwealth service personnel, 31 from World War I and 8 from World War II. Also buried here is a World War I Victoria Cross winner, Captain George Burdon McKean (1888-1926).

=== Woodvale Cemetery and Crematorium ===
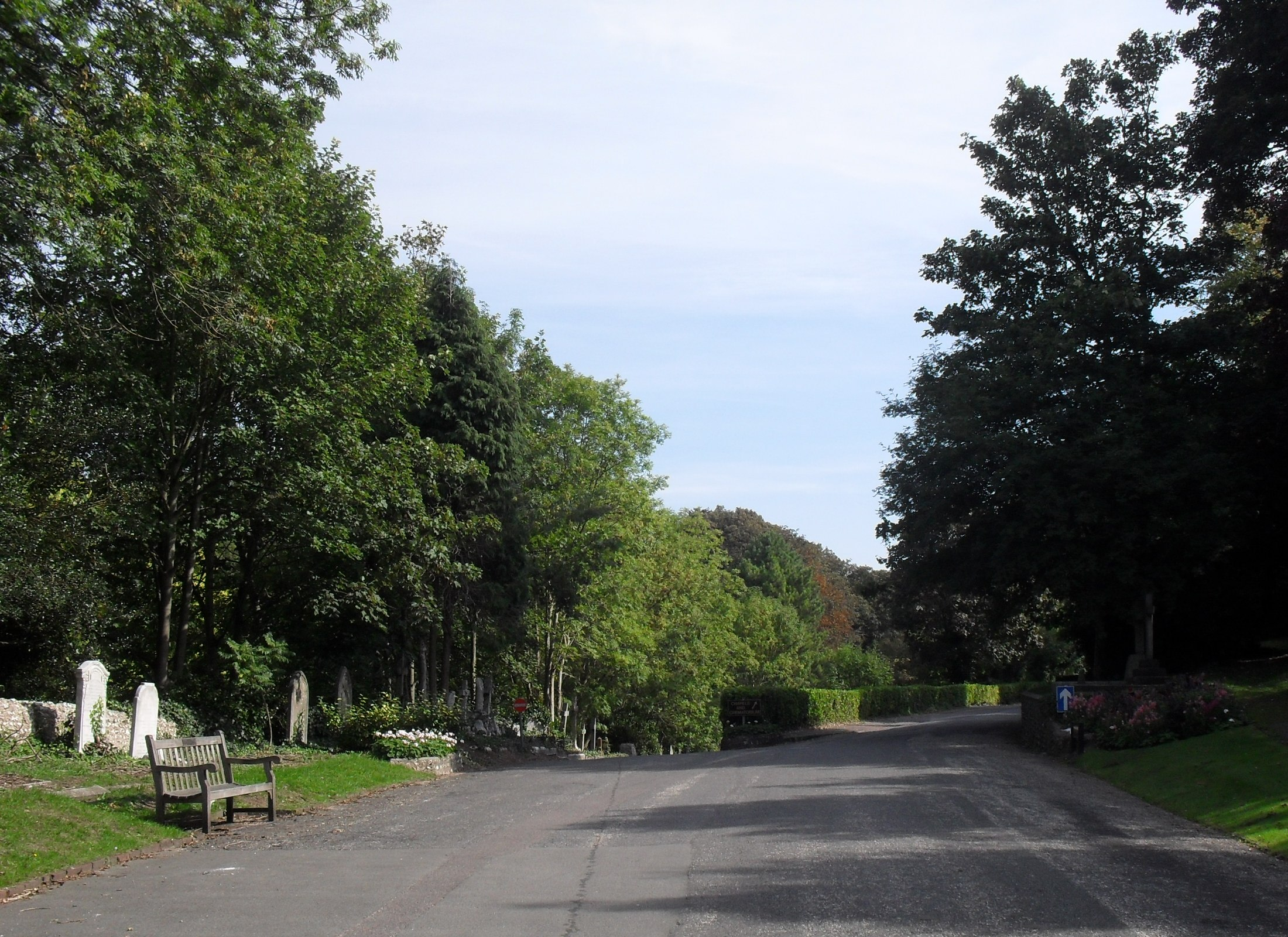
The approach road to the Woodvale cemetery, between high tree-lined banks, splits into three avenues which run through the valley between the graves.

Woodvale Cemetery is approached from Lewes Road along a long, sloping, tree-lined avenue. The original north and south lodges halfway along, built for the cemetery gardeners in the 19th century, are now the Council's Bereavement Services offices and staff accommodation respectively. The north lodge, rising to two storeys unlike its single-storey counterpart, is Grade II-listed; both are flint-built Gothic Revival structures. The cemetery is set in a shallow valley with many ancient trees and large areas of landscaped shrubbery and flowers. Access from the approach avenue into the cemetery is along three parallel drives, laid out in the 1850s and 1860s, which end at the top of the valley by the chapels. These paired Gothic Revival structures, connected by a tower with a spire, were built in 1857 and are jointly listed at Grade II. The walls are of flint with some sandstone; the steeply pitched chapel roofs have slate tiles. The north chapel was consecrated for Anglican use, while the south was used for Nonconformist services. The tower rises from a central carriage arch with an ogee-shaped hood mould above the pointed arch. The lancet windows have intricate tracery. The tower is buttressed and rises in three stages to a belfry and a broach spire.

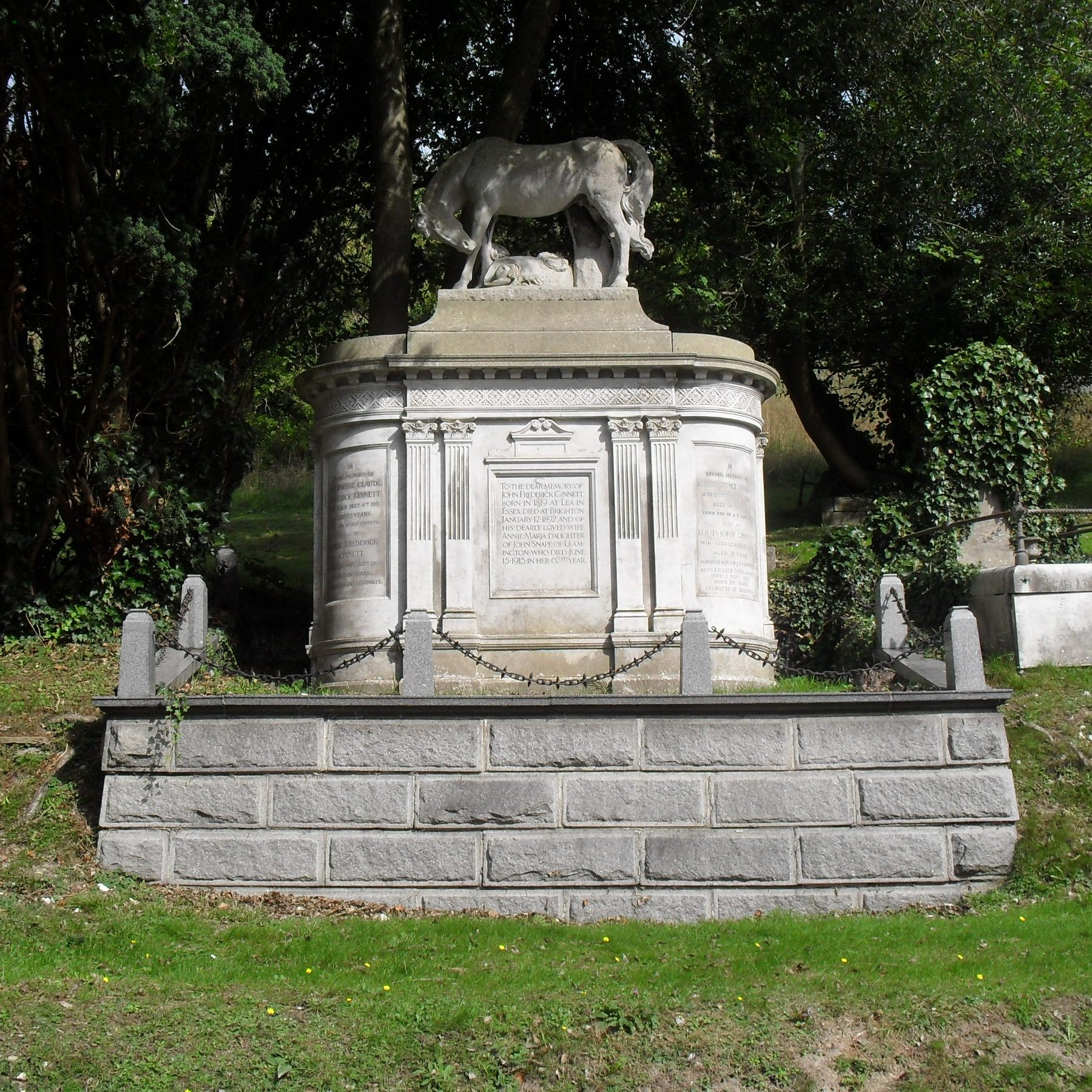
The elaborate Ginnett family tomb is topped with a marble pony.

The largest and most distinctive monument—described as "the most beautiful tomb in either [Extra Mural or Woodvale] cemetery"—is the Grade II-listed Ginnett family tomb. John Frederick Ginnett was a circus proprietor who owned a popular circus and theatre at Park Crescent in the Round Hill area of Brighton. The tall oval tomb of granite, marble and Portland stone has Classical-style embellishments (friezework, Ionic pilasters and rustication) and is topped by a nearly full-size pony of marble. The long-serving father-and-son Vicars of Brighton, Rev. Henry Michell Wagner and Rev. Arthur Douglas Wagner, are buried near the middle pathway in a grave topped by a red marble cross. During their service in Brighton, which spanned most of the 19th century, 15 new Anglican churches were built; they founded and endowed six themselves, and paid for houses and education for poor people. Their strongly Anglo-Catholic views aroused controversy locally and nationally, and they were frequently attacked verbally and physically. Nearby, members of the Nye Chart family, who made Brighton's Theatre Royal one of England's most important theatres, are interred in a tomb with a gabled headstone. The Clarke family tomb, standing on a knoll near the chapels, commemorates several Clarkes who were influential in 19th-century Brighton. Somers Clarke senior was a founder of Brighton's longest established firm of solicitors and a churchwarden at St Nicholas' Church for 62 years; and his son George Somers Clarke, an Egyptologist and architect, designed or made extensions to local churches such as Holy Trinity, St Martin's, St Peter's and St Nicholas'. Thomas Highflyer, a formerly enslaved boy who settled in Brighton, was buried in the cemetery in 1870. The 1st Marquess of Bristol, who gave the land for the Woodvale Cemetery, was originally buried in the cruciform Gothic Revival tomb which still bears his name, but his body was later taken to St Mary's Church, Ickworth—the church closest to Ickworth House, where the Marquesses are traditionally buried. Cremated remains are now stored in the gable-topped mausoleum. It stands near the Bristol Ground, originally a pauper burial area within the Extra Mural Cemetery but now part of the Woodvale grounds: it has become a memorial garden attached to the crematorium.

The crematorium, inaugurated in 1930, was built behind the Nonconformist chapel and has an octagonal chimney. The materials are the same as those of the chapels. It is Sussex's oldest crematorium. Known as the Brighton Borough Crematorium at first, it was renamed the Woodvale Crematorium when the Parochial Cemetery (as it was known from 1902) became the Woodvale Cemetery in 1955. There is a memorial placed by the Commonwealth War Graves Commission listing 54 Commonwealth service personnel of World War II cremated here, comprising 12 Royal Navy sailors, 19 British Army soldiers, 18 British airmen, 2 merchant seamen, a Home Guardsman, a Canadian and an Indian serviceman. Two Victoria Cross winners were also cremated here: Major General William George Walker (1863–1936) and Captain Philip John Gardner, late Royal Tank Regiment (1914–2003). In 1947, the occultist Aleister Crowley (who had died at Hastings) was cremated there. About 20 of his followers attended the service; as soon as Crowley's coffin was brought out, they "began chanting black magic incantations, to the astonishment of the attendants and undertakers", and Louis Wilkinson read excerpts from the Gnostic Mass, The Book of the Law, and "Hymn to Pan". Following newspaper reports that a Black Mass had been held at the ceremony, the council moved to ban the practice at the chapel: councillors described the events as "a desecration of consecrated ground" and stated that they had offended the whole town. English Wiccan writer Doreen Valiente was, in a more low-key ceremony, herself cremated at Woodvale in 1999 with a Wiccan High Priest officiating. Actor Alfred Lynch was cremated at Woodvale in 2003, and actress Hilda Braid, notable in her role as 'Nana' Moon in EastEnders, in 2007. In 2020, the cremation and private burial of "Forces' Sweetheart" Dame Vera Lynn took place at Woodvale following a military procession from her home village of Ditchling.

Renovation work was scheduled for April 2013 at the crematorium. New cremators were to be installed with the ability to retain and recycle waste heat, and the chapels were due to be redecorated. The council said about £1.5 million would be spent but savings of £42,000 per year would arise.

=== Hove Cemetery ===
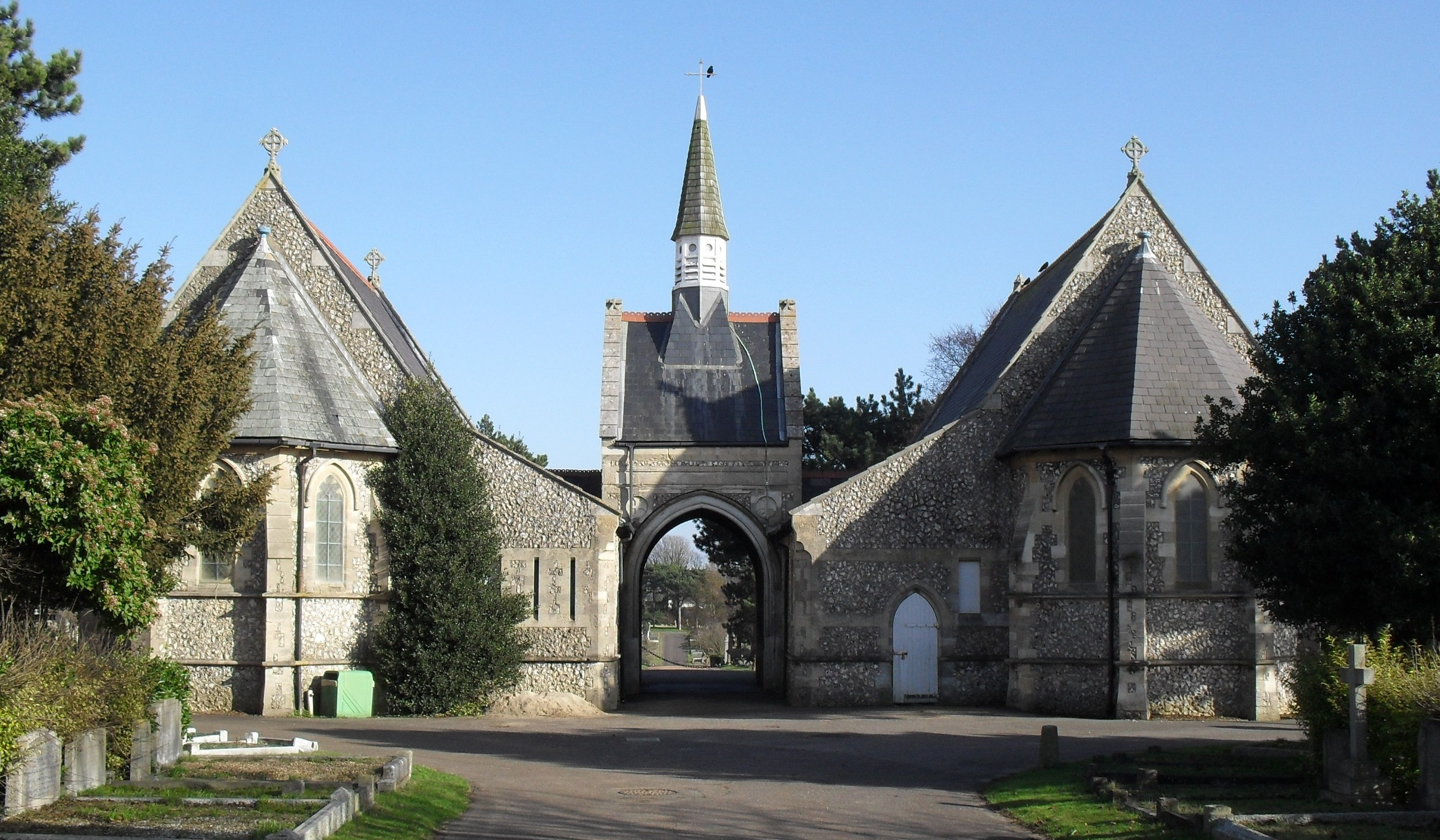
The twin cemetery chapels date from 1880.

A deal to buy the land for what became the first section of Hove Cemetery, south of Old Shoreham Road, was signed in 1878, but work could not start until late 1879 because of a dispute with the Dyke Railway Company. Their branch line to Devil's Dyke formed the eastern boundary of the site, and ownership and other legal rights had to be confirmed with the Hove Commissioners and the Aldrington Estate. The two cemetery chapels were designed early in 1880 by Hove Commissioners Surveyor E.B. Ellice Clark; the design was approved by the Bishop of Chichester in April 1880 except for a proposed tower, which was replaced by a cheaper spire. The paired chapels are linked by a central archway which is topped with the thin spire; both are 36 by 18 feet (11.0 m × 5.5 m) and have apsidal ends. Exterior flintwork hides internal walls of custom-made bricks from Chelmsford. One chapel was consecrated for Anglican use. James Longley and Company of Crawley was the building contractor. Another builder, J. Marshall, won the contract for the superintendent's lodge house at the entrance and the surrounding flint and brick walls. After much debate about where to extend the cemetery, Hove Council bought more than 20 acres (8.1 ha) north of Old Shoreham Road from the Sackville estate in 1923. They paid £6,450 for the land.

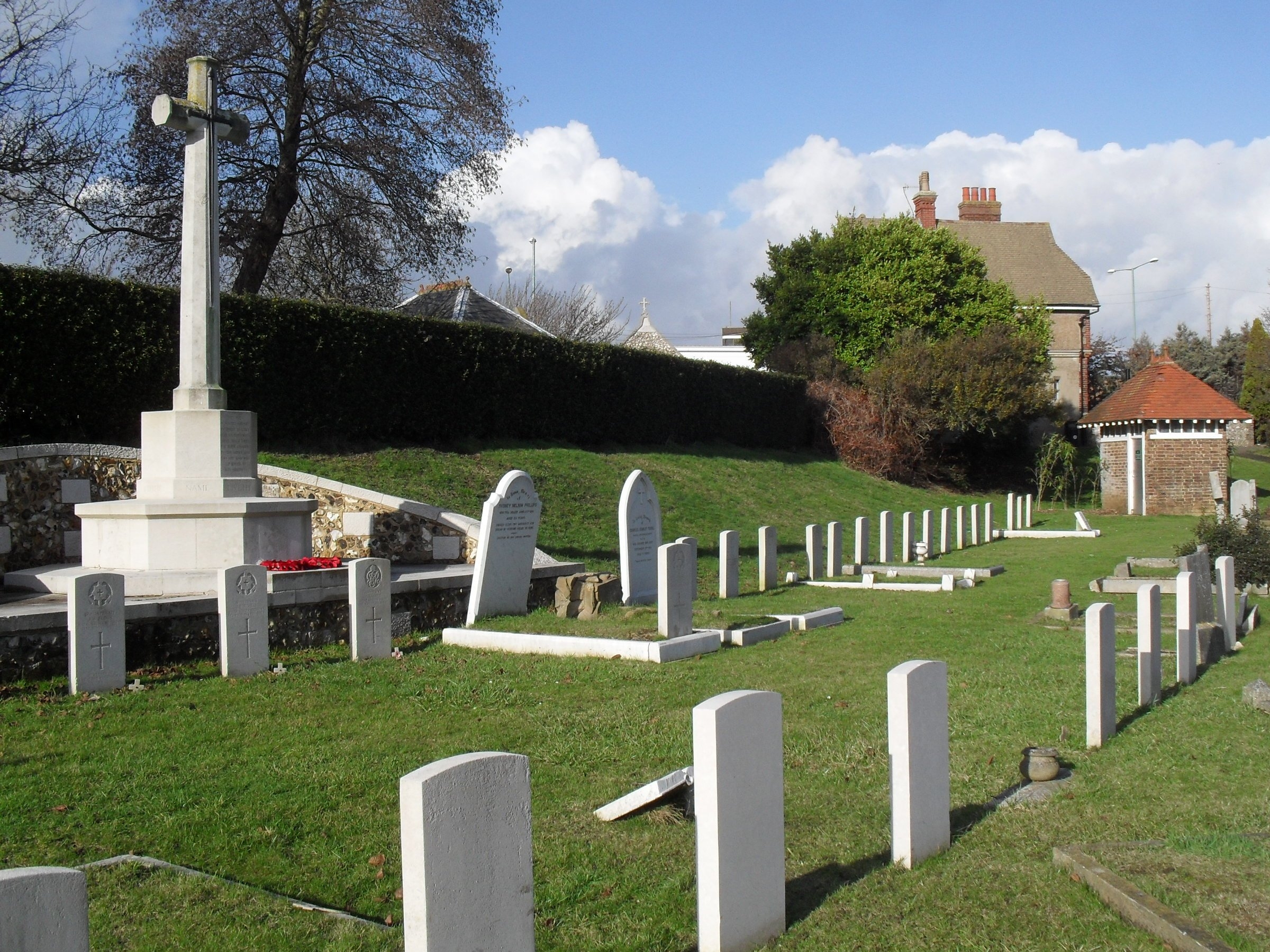
There is a section for Commonwealth war graves.

The first person buried was Frederick Tooth on 15 January 1882. A timber merchant by trade, he was also a Hove Commissioner and a trustee of Shoreham Harbour and the Brighton and Sussex Equitable Permanent Benefit Building Society. This became the Alliance Building Society and, after a merger in 1985, the Alliance & Leicester (now a bank operating under the Santander brand). The first 8 acres (3.2 ha) of the cemetery were consecrated on 27 May 1882, shortly after 1/2 acre (0.20 ha) was set aside for Roman Catholic burials. Another 4 acres (1.6 ha) of previously undeveloped land, again on the south side of Old Shoreham Road, was consecrated in 1912 in a lavish ceremony, although paths had been laid out and trees were planted in 1893. The Roman Catholic section was not consecrated at first. A Muslim section was laid out in 1981. The later northern section of the cemetery has two Jewish burial grounds overseen by the Brighton and Hove Reform Synagogue, and there are sections for Polish burials, Baháʼí adherents and Coptic Orthodox Christians (there is a Coptic Orthodox church in Hove). An area of war graves was created in 1917 in the southern part of the cemetery for Canadian soldiers, and the Imperial (later Commonwealth) War Graves Commission (now abbreviated CWGC) enclosed and landscaped the section in the 1920s. This section is classified by CWGC as Hove Old Cemetery and has the graves of 102 Commonwealth service personnel of both World Wars. A similar enclosure was made later in the northern section—classified by the CWGC as Hove New Cemetery—for 37 World War II graves, of the 67 total Commonwealth service war graves that are in this section.

Burials include Italian composer Luigi Arditi, England cricketer Jack Hobbs, art collector Alexander Constantine Ionides, Boer War general Sir Thomas Kelly-Kenny, boxer Charley Mitchell and journalist and author George Augustus Sala. Nuns from the Little Sisters for the Poor, whose convent stood near the cemetery, are buried in a large grave in the Roman Catholic section. Space remains for new burials in traditional or flat ("lawn") graves.

=== Portslade Cemetery ===
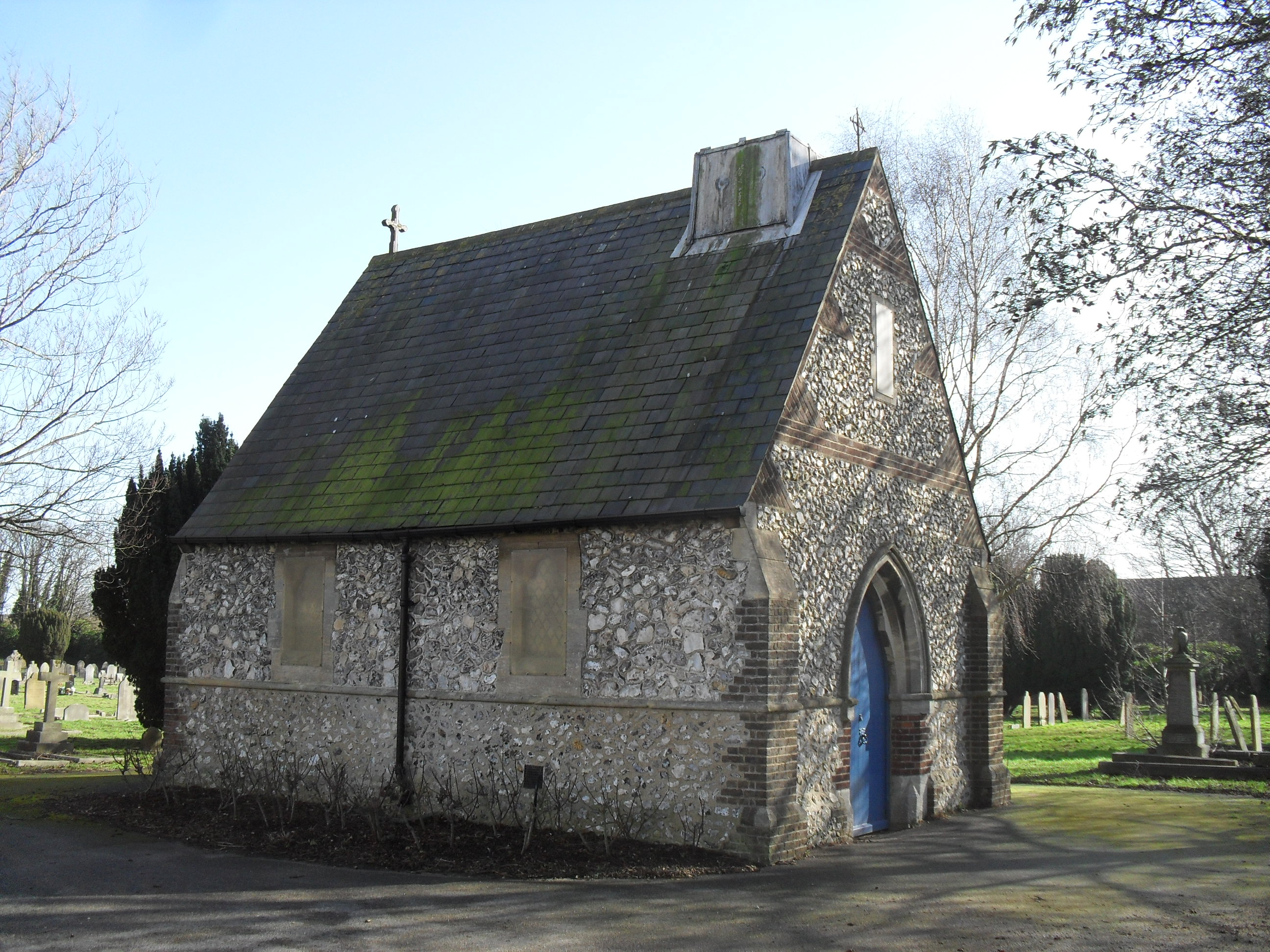
Edmund Scott designed Portslade Cemetery's two chapels.

Now owned and operated by Brighton and Hove City Council, this 7-acre (2.8 ha) cemetery lies alongside the West Coastway railway line and is accessed from Victoria or Trafalgar Roads. No new burial plots are available. Edmund Scott submitted designs for an Anglican and a Nonconformist chapel in 1871. Built by Steyning-based builder W. Watson in 1872, they have flint walls with thin red-brick string courses and additional random angled brick inserts, Bath Stone dressings and boarded interiors. Only the Anglican chapel is still used for funeral services; the other is now a storage shed. A house, called Cemetery Lodge and still used by an employee, was built soon afterwards for the cemetery keeper. The Bishop of Chichester consecrated the original grounds on 9 November 1872; they were extended in 1896 and 1904. The latter extension was prepared for burials in 1925 after spare land was sold for building. The cemetery provides good tree cover in an area of the city with little occurring naturally; species include yew, birch and oak. Burials include Maria Colwell, a child whose death in 1973 in a case of child abuse was widely reported, and Thomas Huntley Wood—a sailor whose face was used on the Player's cigarette logo. The Commonwealth War Graves Commission maintains 39 war graves: 18 from World War I and 21 from World War II.

=== Bear Road (City) Cemetery ===
This 31.5-acre (12.7 ha) site opened in 1868, and no longer accepts new burials. There is a section for the burial of Baháʼí adherents and an area for children. The graves of 275 Commonwealth service personnel of World War I (including 3 unidentified Merchant Navy seamen) and 102 of World War II (including an unidentified British Army soldier) are registered and maintained by the CWGC. Among the identified casualties of the latter war is a Victoria Cross holder, Sergeant-Major George Gristock, who died after being evacuated from the Battle of Belgium in 1940, where his decoration was earned. A longer-lived VC, Captain Frederick Charles Booth, late Rhodesia Police, was buried here in 1960. The large area given over to Commonwealth war graves also has the graves of some German warplane pilots who died in the Brighton area after being shot down during World War II, among the 40 foreign national war graves in the cemetery. Former residents of the Blind Veterans UK (formerly St Dunstan's) home for blind ex-service personnel of the Armed Forces in Ovingdean are also buried here.

Compared to the Extra Mural and Woodvale cemeteries, the terrain is flat and open, with little tree cover. A woodland burial area, in which only biodegradable coffins are allowed, was created in 1994.

=== Brighton and Preston (aka Downs) Cemetery ===
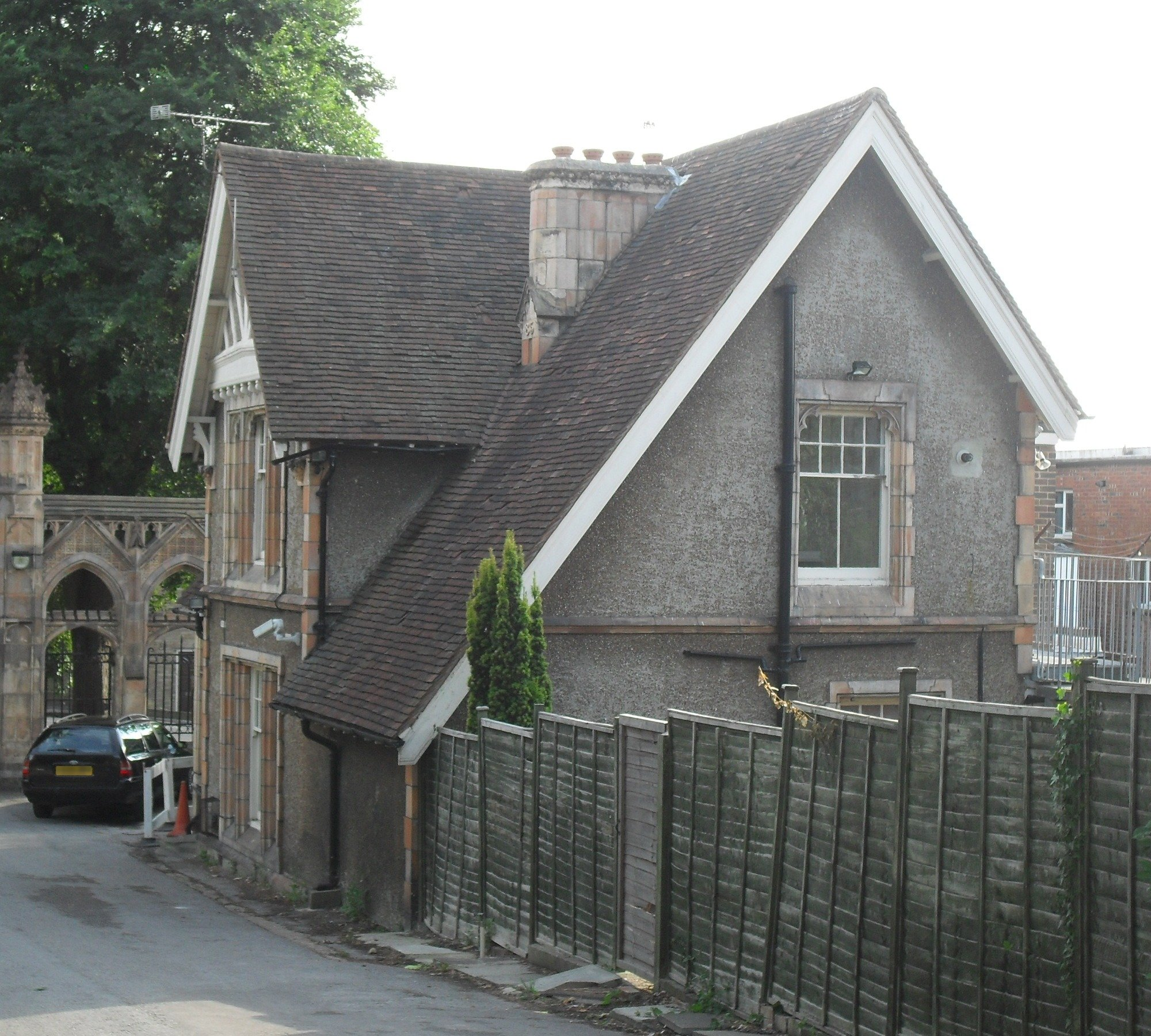
The privately owned cemetery has a gabled lodge house of 1885 at the entrance.

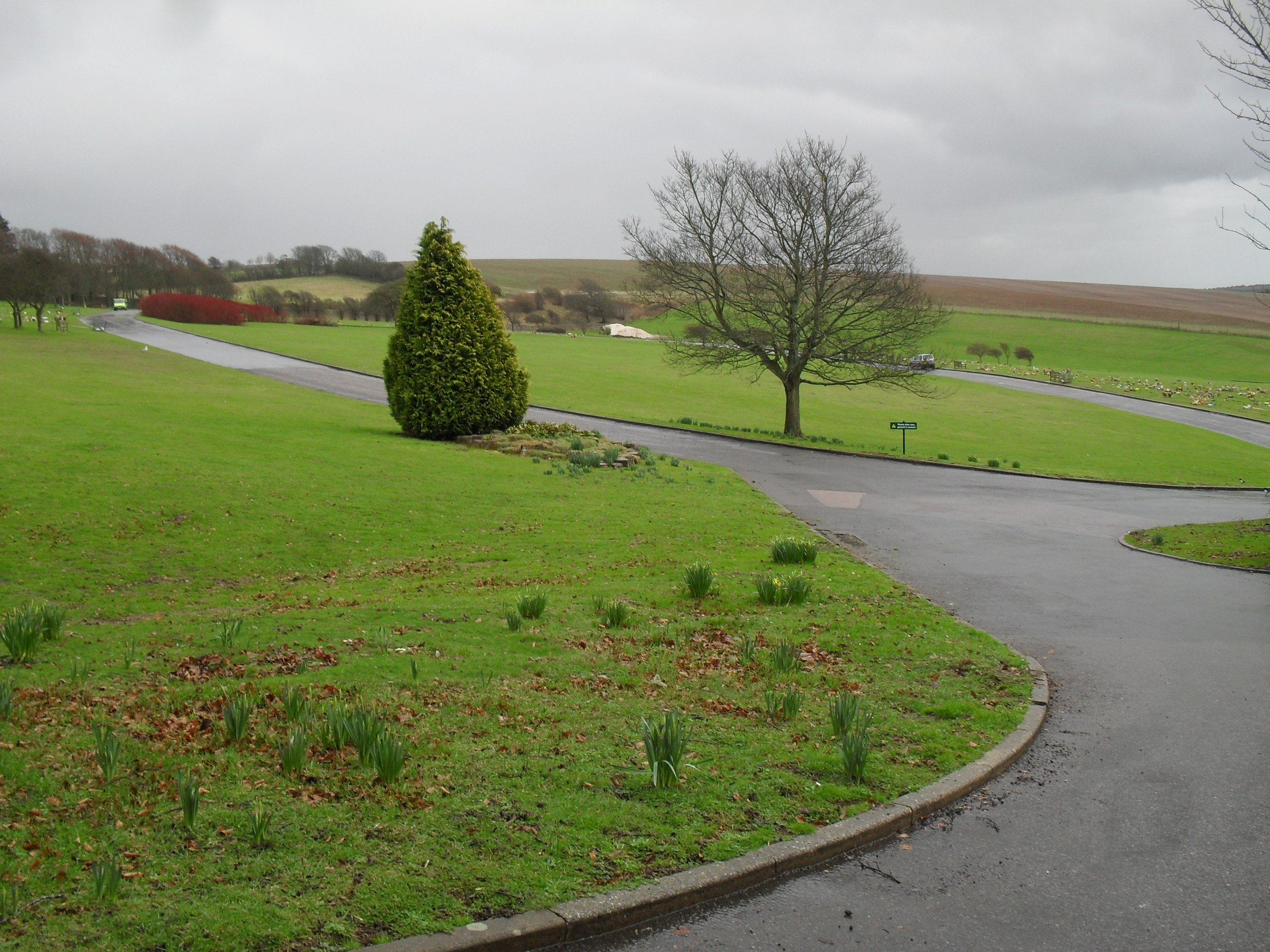
The Lawn Cemetery at Woodingdean has flat headstones.

This cemetery occupies an L-shaped area of relatively flat, open land south of Woodvale Cemetery. Access is off Hartington Road, and two structures there are Grade II-listed buildings. The archway and attached walls and gates form an ornate entrance: they were erected in 1885, just before the cemetery opened, and are Gothic Revival in style. The five-bay wall has a carriage arch in its central bay flanked by narrower Tudor-style arches with footpaths. These are in turn flanked by iron screens in the outer bays. The arches have gates with decorative ironwork. The arch is topped with pinnacles and has the lettering brighton & preston cemetery in its tympanum. The structure is mostly terracotta with some inlaid flint, while the attached walls facing the road are mainly flint with some terracotta and ironwork. The adjacent lodge house, built at the same time, is stuccoed with some terracotta. Built in the vernacular "Old English"-style with gable ends and steep, long roofs, it has ornately moulded corbels, bargeboards and chimneys. It is linked to the entrance arch by flint and terracotta walls. The mortuary chapel, built in 1900, is also listed at Grade II. The Gothic Revival building has a square west tower with an octagonal spire and lancet windows, an arched entrance and a two-bay nave with an ogee-headed east window. The walls are of flint with prominent red-brick courses and quoins. Burials in the cemetery include Violet Kaye, victim of one of the Brighton trunk murders of 1934.

The Commonwealth War Graves Commission, who list this as the Brighton (Downs) Cemetery, maintain the graves of 118 Commonwealth service personnel, from both World Wars, which are dispersed throughout the cemetery.

=== Downs Crematorium ===
Privately run by Dignity Funerals Ltd, this crematorium adjoins the north end of the Brighton and Preston Cemetery, from which it has direct access. The building was designed by local architect John Leopold Denman. One of the first cremations to take place after it opened in 1941 was that of Virginia Woolf, who committed suicide at nearby Rodmell. Actor Sir George Robey, who died at Saltdean, was cremated here following his death in 1954.

A Screen Wall memorial in the Garden of Rest, erected by the Commonwealth War Graves Commission, commemorates 29 service personnel cremated here during World War II, comprising 4 Royal Navy sailors, 14 British Army soldiers, 9 British airmen, a British Merchant Navy seaman and an airman of the Royal Australian Air Force. Also cremated here was a World War I Victoria Cross winner, Captain John James Crowe (1876-1965).

=== Lawn Memorial Cemetery, Woodingdean ===
The Lawn Memorial Cemetery is now Brighton's main site for new burials. It was opened on 1 January 1963 on a 9.5-acre (3.8 ha) stretch of farmland on Warren Farm, a stretch of downland south of Warren Road on the approach to the suburb of Woodingdean, and now covers 36.5 acres (14.8 ha). There are no chapels, but those at Woodvale Cemetery can be used instead. Quaker and Muslim sections have been laid out in the cemetery. No upright gravestones are permitted: only "lawn-style" burials with flat memorial tablets are available. The 311 bodies of Quakers exhumed from the former burial ground on Rifle Butt Road at Black Rock in 1972 were reburied on land at this cemetery, which is also called the Lawn Memorial Park. A woodland burial area was created in 2010. The "tranquil" sloping site is surrounded by trees and has views to the English Channel.

== The Chattri ==
Hundreds of Indian soldiers who fought for the Allied Powers during World War I were brought to Brighton to be treated for combat injuries. Most recovered, but 74 died. The 21 deceased Muslim soldiers were buried at the Horsell Common, near the Shah Jahan Mosque in Woking, Surrey, in accordance with Islamic tradition (to be later reinterred at Brookwood Military Cemetery in 1968); but the 53 Hindu and Sikh soldiers who died were cremated on a ghat (funeral pyre) on a remote site on the South Downs above Brighton. Samuel Swinton Jacob and Indian architect E.C. Henriques designed a marble, stone and granite war memorial—the Chattri—which stands on the cremation site. The domed octagonal structure is now Grade II-listed and was dedicated on 1 February 1921. The names of the cremated dead are not listed on the Chattri memorial, but were belatedly listed on the Patcham Down Indian Forces' Cremation Memorial, erected nearby in 2010 by the Commonwealth War Graves Commission.

== Victoria Cross holders ==
Six holders of the Victoria Cross are buried in the city's cemeteries.

Name	Awarded	Cemetery	Notes	Refs
Captain Frederick Booth vc dcm	18 February 1917	Bear Road (City) Cemetery	Awarded "for most conspicuous bravery during an attack, in thick bush, on the enemy position". Booth served attached to the Rhodesian Native Regiment during World War I. He rescued a seriously injured man while under "heavy rifle fire" and then helped to organise native troops during a battle in German East Africa.	
John James Crowe vc	14 April 1918	Downs Crematorium	Awarded "for most conspicuous bravery, determination, and skilful leading". Crowe was a member of the Worcestershire Regiment and was fighting in the Battle of Lys in Belgium during World War I. He twice engaged the enemy in the village where they were fighting, forcing them to retreat, then attacked and captured two machine-gun posts and killed several of the enemy, forcing the rest to withdraw.	
George Gristock vc	21 May 1940	Bear Road (City) Cemetery	Awarded "for most conspicuous gallantry". Gristock was a Warrant Officer Class II in the Royal Norfolk Regiment. During the Battle of France, during a "prolonged attack" in which his company were threatened, he put a machine-gun post out of action and killed its crew despite suffering serious wounds from machine-gun fire from which he later died.	
Lieutenant George Burdon McKean vc mc mm	27/28 April 1918	Extra Mural Cemetery	Awarded "for most conspicuous bravery and devotion to duty during a raid on the enemy's trenches." McKean was a lieutenant in the 14th (The Royal Montreal Regiment) Battalion of the Canadian Expeditionary Force who was fighting in France in World War I. With his party held up in a trench by intense fire, he ran into the open, landing head first on top of an enemy soldier. He was then attacked by another with a fixed bayonet. He shot both men, captured the position, then sent back for more bombs, and until they arrived he engaged the enemy single-handed. He then rushed a second block, killing two of the enemy, capturing four others, and driving the remainder into a dug-out, which he then destroyed.	
Lieutenant-General Sir Wilbraham Lennox vc kcb	20 November 1854	Woodvale Cemetery	Awarded for "cool and gallant conduct in establishing a lodgement in Tryon's Rifle Pit, and assisting to repel the assaults of the enemy". Lennox was a lieutenant in the Corps of Royal Engineers during the Siege of Sevastopol in the Crimean War. His actions drew particular praise from General François Certain Canrobert.	
Captain William George Walker vc cb	22 April 1903	Woodvale Crematorium	Awarded for brave conduct during the Third Somaliland Expedition of 1903. As a captain 4th Gurkha Rifles, Indian Army, he was attached to the Bikaner Camel Corps. While returning from action at Daratoleh, part of the column got separated when the terrain became difficult and while wounded men were being mounted on camels. They came under enemy fire, and Walker and another officer kept the enemy at bay.	

== Administration ==
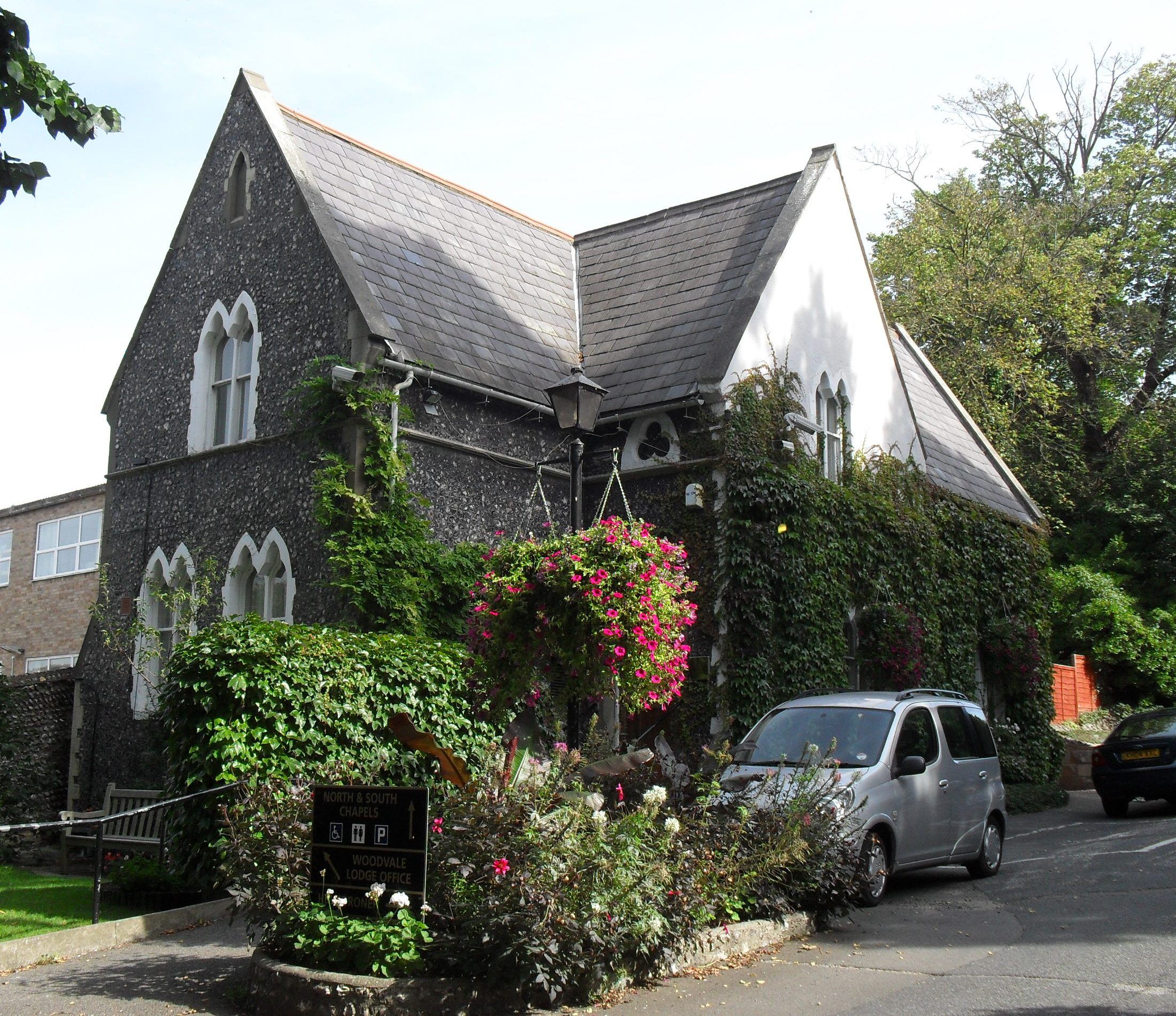
The North Lodge at Woodvale Cemetery is home to the council's Bereavement Services division.

Brighton and Hove City Council owns and operates the Hove, Portslade, Woodvale, City (Bear Road), Extra Mural and Lawn Memorial Cemeteries, the new Jewish burial ground, and the Woodvale Crematorium. All are open to the public every day of the year; opening hours vary between summer and winter. The Brighton and Preston Cemetery and the Downs Crematorium are privately owned and run by Dignity Funerals Ltd.

The council's Bereavement Services division is based at Woodvale Lodge, one of two entrance lodges on the approach road to the Woodvale Cemetery. Also on this approach road is the Brighton and Hove City Mortuary. In cases where a person has died suddenly, violently or in an unexplained way, the city coroner's support staff transfer the body to this building. Mortuary staff and the city coroner then prepare and examine it. The coroner's office is at Woodvale Lodge; support staff operate from Brighton's main police station in the Carlton Hill area of the city. Inquests are normally held at Woodvale Lodge, but to help with social distancing during the COVID-19 pandemic other venues such as the Sussex County Cricket Ground in Hove were used as well.

As of 2012, Brighton and Hove City Council charged £377 for a weekday funeral, £530 for one on a Saturday and £647 for a Sunday or Bank Holiday service. Cremation services on weekdays cost £373. A plot at the Lawn Memorial Cemetery cost £292; a conventional grave was £377. Plans to increase these prices were announced in January 2012.

== See also ==
- Buildings and architecture of Brighton and Hove
- List of places of worship in Brighton and Hove
- Media related to Cemeteries and crematoria in Brighton and Hove at Wikimedia Commons
