= John Weiss (disambiguation) =

John Weiss may refer to:

== People ==
- John Weiss (1818–1879), American author
- John Weiss (American football) (1921–1990), American football player
- John Weiss (1933–2018), jewellery designer, wife of Althea McNish

== Other uses ==
- John Weiss & Son, firm of London-based surgical instrument makers

== See also ==
- Jonathan M. Weiss (born 1942), American scholar
