= St Nicholas Church, Brighton =

St. Nicholas of Myra, Brighton
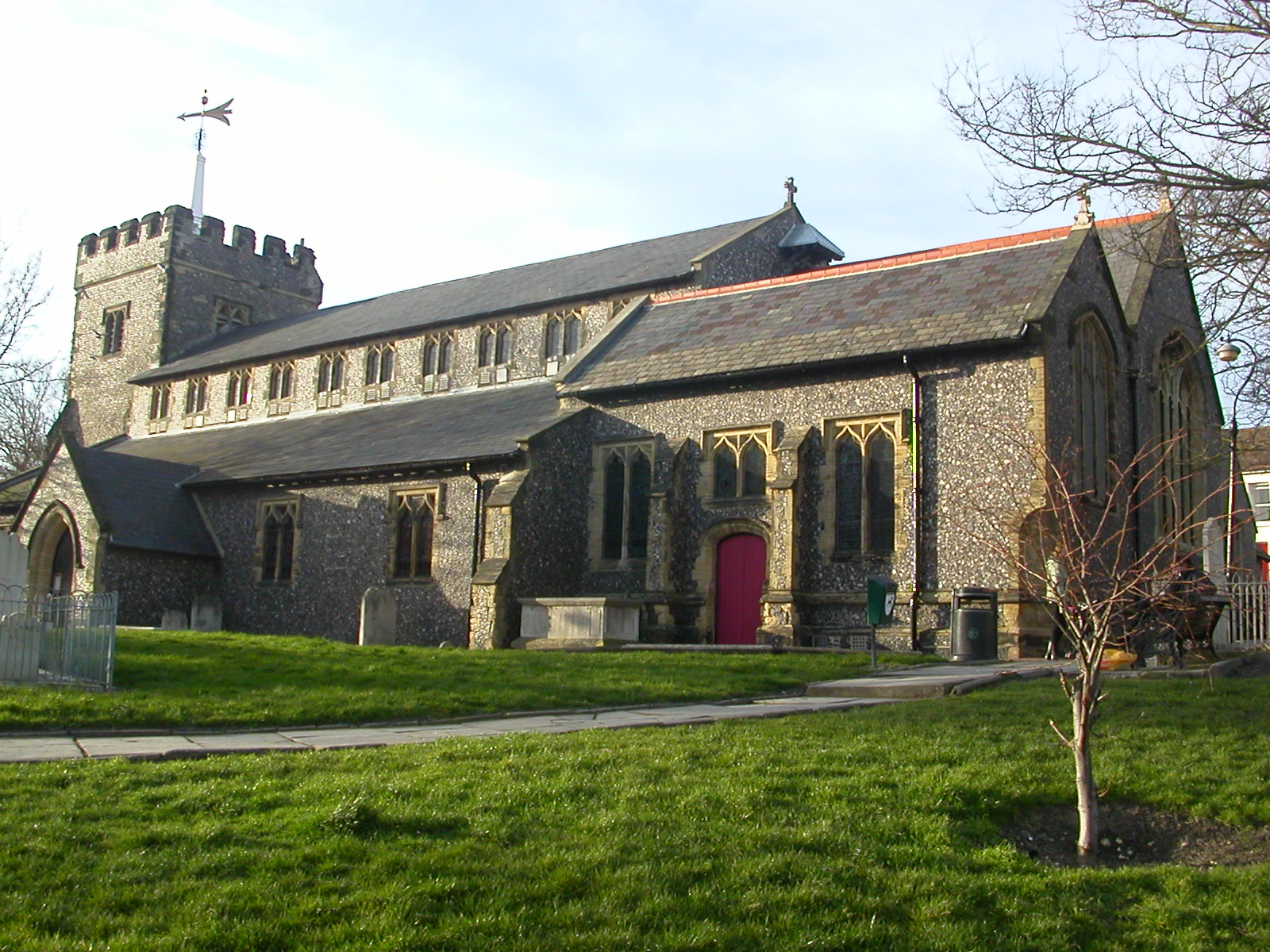
- View of St Nicholas Church from the churchyard
- St. Nicholas of Myra, Brighton
- 50°49′31.29″N 0°8′41.47″W
- Location: Church Street, Brighton, East Sussex BN1 3LJ
- Denomination: Church of England
- Previous denomination: Catholic
- Churchmanship: Affirming Catholic
- Website: St. Nicholas, Brighton

History
- Dedication: St. Nicholas of Myra

Administration
- Province: Canterbury
- Diocese: Chichester
- Archdeaconry: Chichester
- Deanery: Brighton
- Parish: Brighton, St Nicholas

Clergy
- Vicar: Interregnum

The Church of Saint Nicholas of Myra, usually known as St. Nicholas Church, is an Anglican church in Brighton, England. It is both the original parish church of Brighton and, after St Helen's Church, Hangleton and St Peter's Church in Preston village, the third oldest surviving building in the city of Brighton and Hove. It is located on high ground at the junction of Church Street and Dyke Road in the city centre, very close to the main shopping areas. Due to its architectural significance the church is a Grade II* listed building.

== Early history ==
The Domesday Book of 1086 records the presence of a church, valued at £12, in what was then the small fishing village of Bristelmestune. Shortly afterwards, it was granted to the Cluniac priory in nearby Lewes. Although there is no certainty over where this church was located, it is possible that it stood on the site of the present-day St. Nicholas church: although Bristelmestune was located some distance to the south immediately adjacent to the coast, the ground there was marshy and suffered from erosion, and was vulnerable to attacks from invaders. The higher ground of the hill where the present church stands would have been better strategically and defensively, as well as being highly visible both to residents of the village and the fishermen at sea.

== Construction of the present church ==
In its current form, St. Nicholas church dates from the mid-14th century. A font from that period is preserved within the church. It was carved in around 1170 and in 2001 was relocated to a prominent position at the west end of the church, the latest of several moves over the centuries.

The church, as originally constructed in the 14th century, consists of a substantial tower at the west end, a chancel and an aisled nave. Early additions include a chantry, dating from the 15th century; these additional chapels were relatively common at that time.

A devastating attack from abroad occurred in June 1514, when French raiders landed on the coast and burned the surrounding village (by now known as Brighthelmstone) in its entirety. Only the church, standing some distance inland and above the fire, survived.

The church was damaged twice in under two years by severe storms which caused significant destruction and loss of life elsewhere in Brighton, especially in the buildings of the "lower town" by the coast. The Great Storm of 1703, in November of that year, ripped lead from the roof; a subsequent storm, in August 1705, blew off all of the remaining sheets of lead. A commemorative tablet, dated 1705, was laid in the replacement roof.

Later in the 18th century, as Brighton's population began to grow, a series of pews, radiating outwards from the font in the centre, were installed. In the second half of that century, when the town's popularity grew substantially in response to Dr. Russell's advocacy of the medicinal benefits of seawater (and, subsequently, the Prince Regent's patronage), space was so limited that a series of galleries had to be built around the roof of the church, accessed by external staircases. At the time, St. Nicholas was the only Anglican church in Brighton.

A model of the interior layout prior to the 1853 reconstruction can be seen today in one corner of the church.

== Patron of the church ==
The ancient Southover Priory in Lewes was responsible for the church from the end of the 11th century until 1537, when the last prior surrendered it to the Crown. In 1540, it passed to Thomas Cromwell, 1st Earl of Essex; in 1541, following his death by execution in July 1540, the advowson was granted to Anne of Cleves; and finally, in 1558, the Bishop of Chichester gained it. The holder of that title has been the patron of the church ever since.

== Rebuilding in 1853 ==
Brighton underwent considerable change during the reign of King George IV (the former Prince Regent) from 1820 to 1830. The town continued to be fashionable, and the number of houses doubled during his 10½-year reign. Eight chapels of ease had been built by 1830 to alleviate the burden on the overcrowded St Nicholas church, but the latter remained popular as it was free to attend. Furthermore, the administrative vestry of the church (the equivalent of the present-day Church of England parochial church council) was ideologically opposed to the responsibility they faced in raising funds for maintaining the fabric of the church. There were frequent disagreements and clashes with the vicar, Rev. Henry Michell Wagner, and deadlock was often reached over the issue of funding – to such an extent that the church became somewhat dilapidated and some of the windows in the chancel had to be boarded up.

The situation was resolved in 1852, when the Duke of Wellington, Arthur Wellesley, died. There were historical links between the Duke and both Rev. Wagner and St. Nicholas Church itself: as a child in the 1780s, he studied at an academy in Nile Street (in what is now The Lanes) run by Wagner's grandfather Rev. Henry Michell; he attended St. Nicholas Church, which at the time was under the curacy of Rev. Michell, to worship; and his sons were taught by Wagner for eight years from 1818. Wagner therefore announced that he would start a fund to pay for the rebuilding of the church as a memorial to the Duke, and donated the first £1,000. Nearly £5,000 more was subsequently raised from public subscriptions and donations.

The architect Richard Cromwell Carpenter, associated with the architectural aspects of the Cambridge Movement and Tractarianism, was chosen to rebuild St Nicholas Church, after authorisation was granted on 15 April 1853 for demolition and reconstruction. The project was completed quite rapidly, given the size of the building, by Carpenter and the appointed building firm (Bushby's of Littlehampton): the church was reopened on 8 April 1854, about nine months after work started.

Work included a new roof; a doubling of the width of the original aisles, and extensions to some of them; a reduction in the size of the chantry; the creation of an organ-chamber and a new east window; the removal of all galleries and original box-pews; and the moving of the font to a position near the south door, which it occupied until the latest move in 2001. A stone cross was installed to commemorate the Duke of Wellington. Carpenter himself died only a year after the project was completed, and a memorial plaque – now lost – was installed in recognition of his life and works. The reconstruction, which cost £5,769, reduced the capacity of the church by approximately 30% to around 900 because the galleries were removed.

== Subsequent work ==
Much work was carried out over the next fifty years, mostly in the form of additions to or replacements of existing fixtures; nevertheless, many of the original mediaeval features of the church were either lost or had their impact reduced.

Somers Clarke, the clerk of the administrative vestry for 62 years from 1830, donated a new pulpit to the church in 1867, after the original three-deck structure was removed by Carpenter and replaced with a much smaller wooden example. Clarke's pulpit was made of iron. A new organ, costing £500, was installed in 1872, and a new vestry was built between 1876 and 1877 to the north of the chancel.

Between 1878 and 1887, a number of stained glass windows were designed and installed. The noted designer Charles Eamer Kempe, a cousin of Thomas Read Kemp, the developer of Brighton's Kemp Town estate, was responsible for many of these; another was donated by Somers Clarke in memory of Rev. Wagner, who had died in 1870. Also during this period, the east window installed by Carpenter was replaced with a Perpendicular-style window. The original window was taken to the relatively new Church of the Annunciation in the Hanover area of the town.

A significant alteration was made in 1892, when the whole roof was removed and lifted mechanically in order to create more space internally. The gap was filled with a series of clerestory windows, and various paintings and murals were added to the new internal space painted by Charles Eamer Kempe.

The 15th-century chantry chapel underwent another change in 1900. Having been reduced in size in the 1853 redevelopment, it was enlarged again, before being converted into a Lady chapel in 1909.

== Bells ==
The first peal of bells, ten in total, was presented to the church in 1777 by Thomas Rudhall, a member of one of the most prominent families in the city of Gloucester's 700-year bell-founding history. They were installed in the tower at the west end of the church. Two were given to St. Peter's Church upon its completion in 1828, but a bequest from a former warden of the church in 1892 funded the purchase of two more to replace these. The whole peal was then replaced in 1922 by a new ring of ten bells by Gillett and Johnson.

It became traditional for the bells to be rung when important visitors, especially monarchs or other members of the Royal Family, came to the town; a series of tablets preserved at the base of the ringing chamber give details of each "special occasion" on which the bells were rung for an extended period, such as Queen Victoria's Golden Jubilee in 1887. In 2009 the bells were rung half-muffled for the funeral of Henry Allingham.

== Churchyard ==
St Nicholas Church is surrounded by a graveyard with many old tombs. It has not accepted any new burials for many years, and was landscaped by the council in the mid-20th century, although most of the tombs of significant historical interest were left undisturbed and all of those monuments listed below have Grade II status.

The oldest memorial is that of Captain Nicholas Tattersell. He took King Charles II from Shoreham harbour to France in 1651 in Surprise, a coal ship he captained. See here for full details of the King's escape from the Battle of Worcester and his passage to Fécamp in Normandy. Upon King Charles's return to Britain in 1660, he granted Tattersell a pension of £100 per year, and Surprise was transferred into the Royal Navy's fleet and renamed The Royal Escape.

John Weiss of John Weiss & Son, the eminent surgical instrument makers, was entombed here in 1843. Weiss had an abiding fear of being buried alive and to ensure his death he devised a metal spike which would penetrate his heart when the lid was lowered on his coffin.

Phoebe Hessel, a famous 18th- and 19th-century resident of Brighton, is buried close by. She fell in love with a soldier, William Golding, at the age of 15, and disguised herself as a man to enlist alongside him in the British Army after he was sent overseas. The concealment of her sex was so effective that she served for 17 years until voluntarily revealing the truth to her commanding officer's wife and being discharged; even after suffering a wounded arm at the Battle of Fontenoy in 1745, she was not discovered during her treatment. She became a well-known figure after moving to Brighton following the death of Golding in the 1760s, and lived to the age of 108—being granted a special pension by the Prince Regent, and travelling in the procession during his coronation as King George IV.

Martha Gunn, one of the town's best-known residents in the 18th and 19th centuries, is also buried in the churchyard. She was the most famous of Brighton's dippers, who helped non-swimmers bathe in the sea (using horse-drawn bathing machines) in the decades after Dr. Richard Russell's advice became popular. Dippers had to be of the same sex as their client (or "bathee"), and Martha Gunn was well regarded for many years by locals and visitors, with her size and strength being a particular advantage in this difficult physical task.

Anna Maria Crouch, a noted singer and actress contemporary with Hessel and Gunn, is commemorated by an impressive stone urn. For much of her career, she was associated with the Theatre Royal, Drury Lane, London, taking both singing and speaking parts in various plays. However, her romantic life was also noteworthy: she married a Royal Navy lieutenant in 1785 after a brief elopement in Ireland the previous year, but took an Irish actor and operatic singer, Michael Kelly, as a lover shortly afterwards. Husband, wife and lover lived together for a time in a ménage à trois, but Anna Maria Crouch also had a relationship with the Prince Regent; and when she later moved to London with Kelly, the Prince was a frequent visitor to their house. She died in 1805, at the age of 42.

Other people important in the history of Brighton to be buried in the churchyard include Sake Dean Mahomet—an Indian man who introduced the Indian curry house restaurant to Great Britain as well as establishing "shampooing" baths in the country, and was appointed shampooing surgeon to both King George IV and William IV and Amon Wilds, one of the most important architects of the Regency era, who provided Brighton with much Regency architecture. Meanwhile, the actress Dame Flora Robson, noted for a long career on stage, television and film, is commemorated with a memorial stone in the churchyard. She lived in a house in Wykeham Terrace, a short distance from the church, for some years until her death in 1984.

The first extension to the churchyard was built in 1824, across Church Street to the north. This has been converted into a playground. Another modest extension was made in 1831, but the most significant change came in 1841 when land to the west of what is now Dyke Road (then named Church Hill) was acquired and used to form a much larger burial ground. This western extension was laid out by Regency architect Amon Henry Wilds and contains a series of burial vaults with Grade II listed status.

== The church today ==
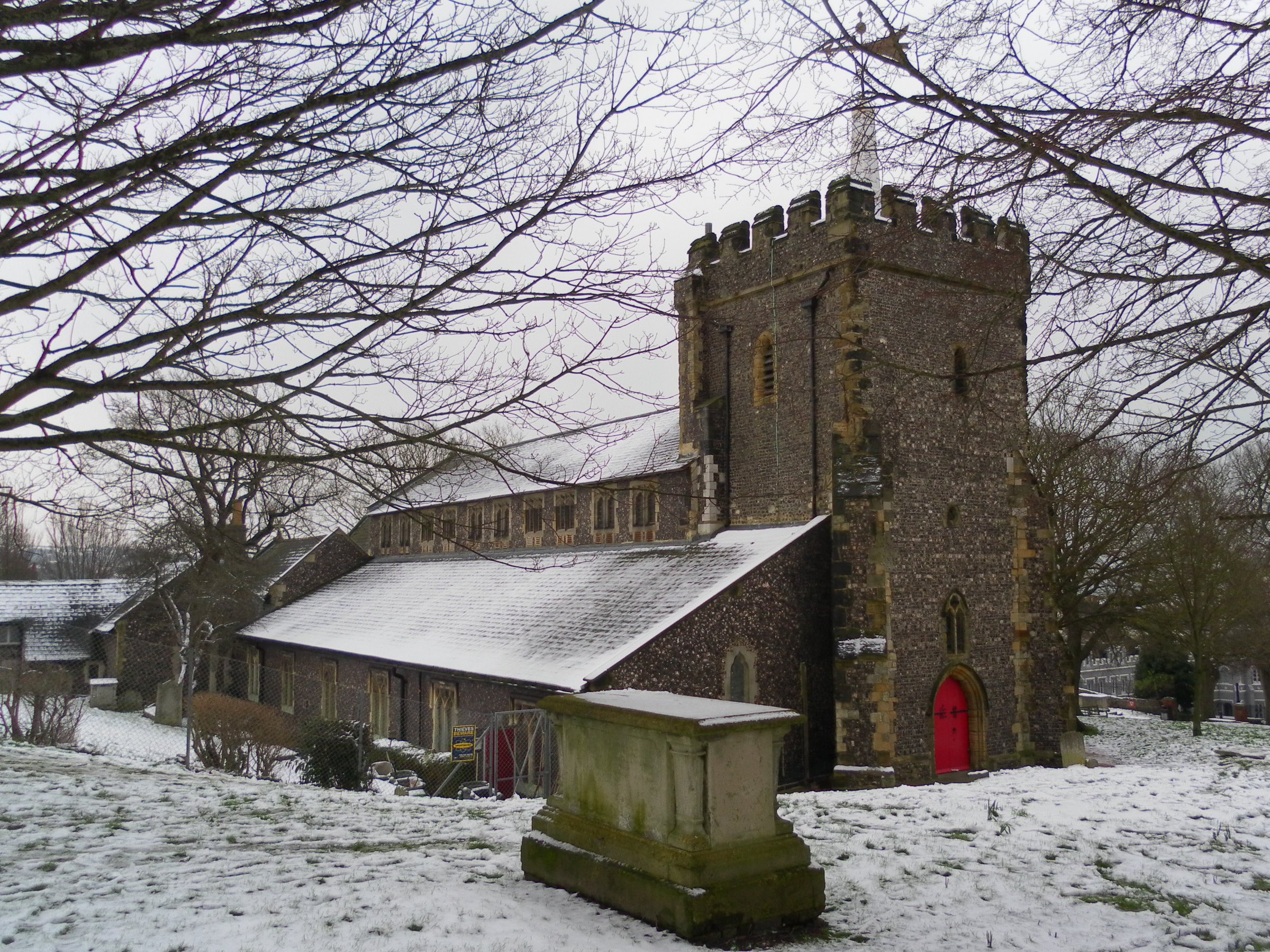
St Nicholas Church in the snow in 2013

St Nicholas Church was listed at Grade II* on 13 October 1952. As of February 2001, it was one of 70 Grade II*-listed buildings and structures, and 1,218 listed buildings of all grades, in the city of Brighton and Hove.

Having been Brighton's parish church for several centuries, St Nicholas Church lost this status in 1873 when the Bishop of Chichester reorganised the entire structure of Brighton's parishes. St Peter's Church had been constructed in 1828 as a chapel of ease associated with St Nicholas Church; in 1873, the two were separated and each allocated their own parish, and St Peter's became Brighton's parish church—perhaps because of its more central location (following the development of the town around it). St Nicholas Church is still widely known as "The Mother Church of Brighton".

== Photo gallery ==
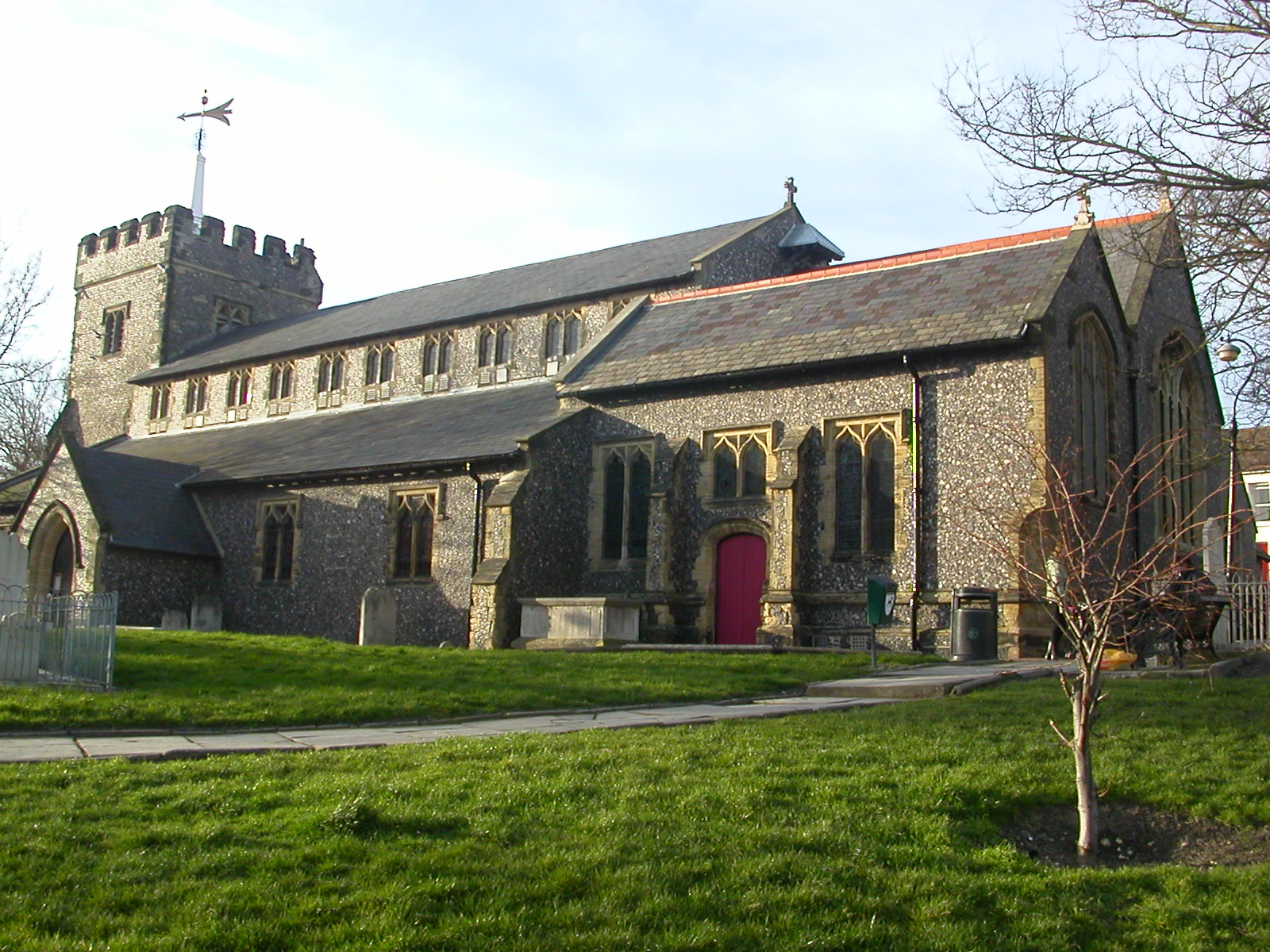
View of St Nicholas Church from the graveyard

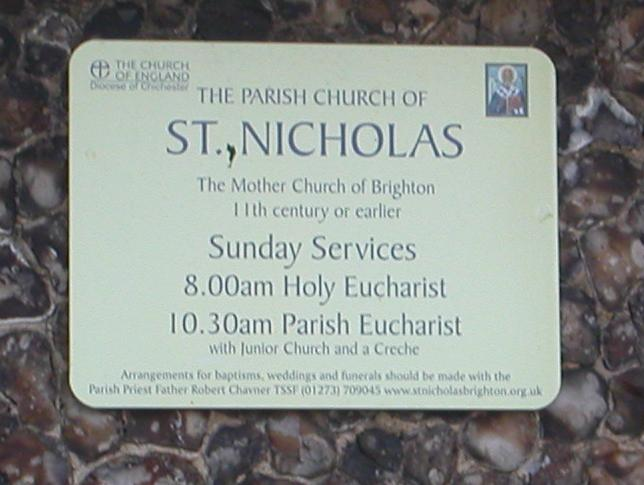
Plaque on the east wall of the church

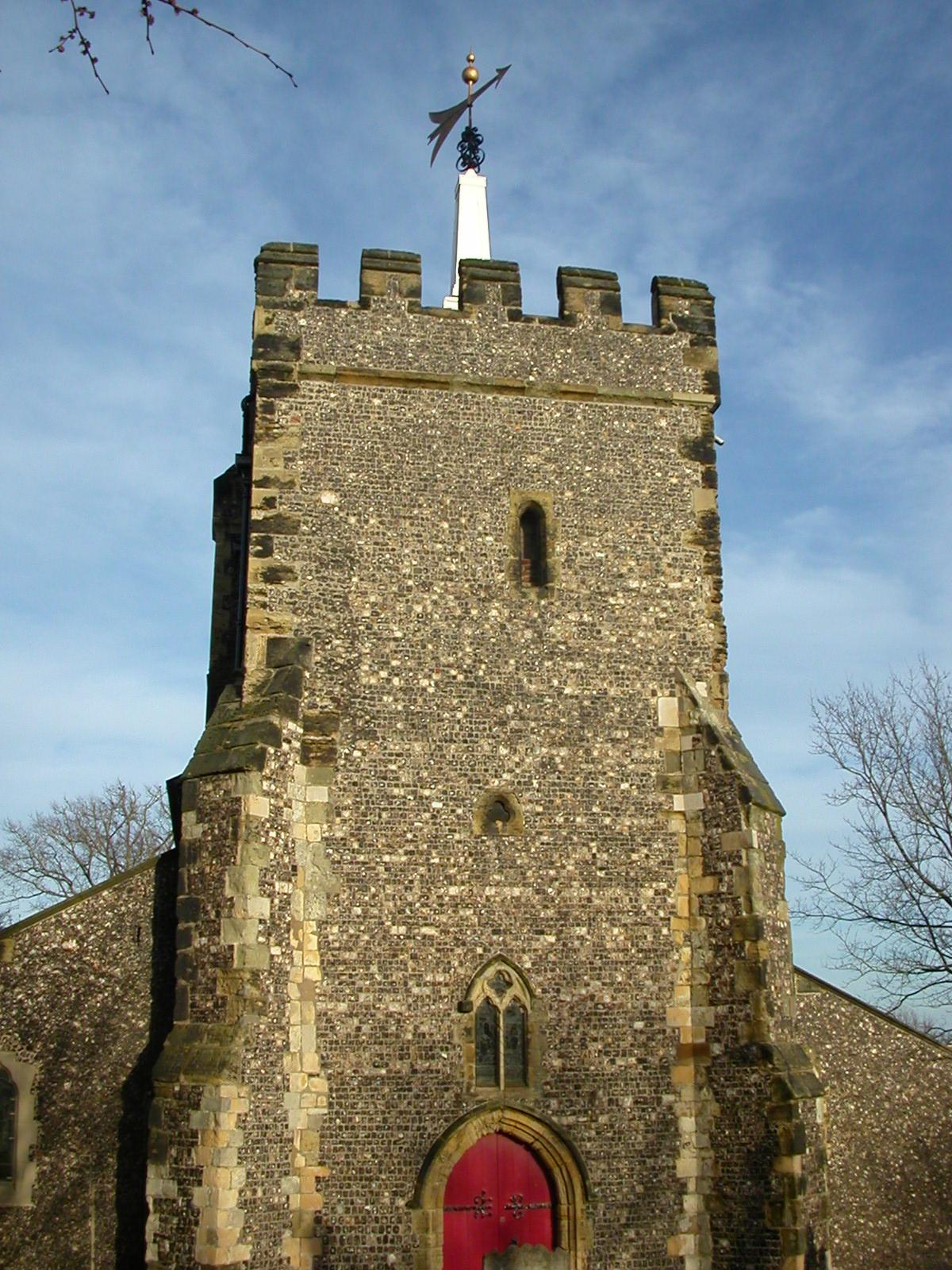
The tower, incorporating stones and blocks of Norman origin

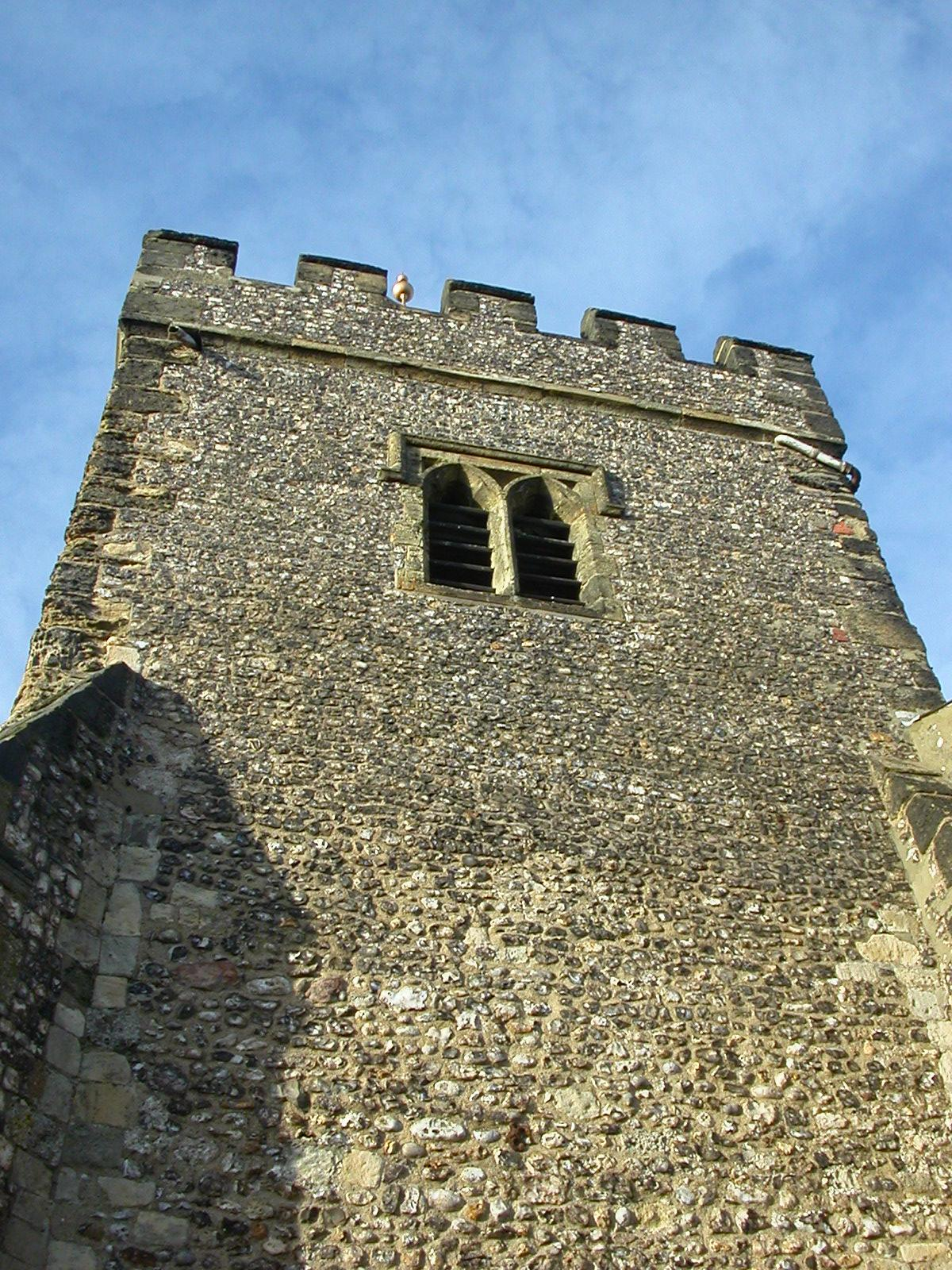
A closer look at the tower

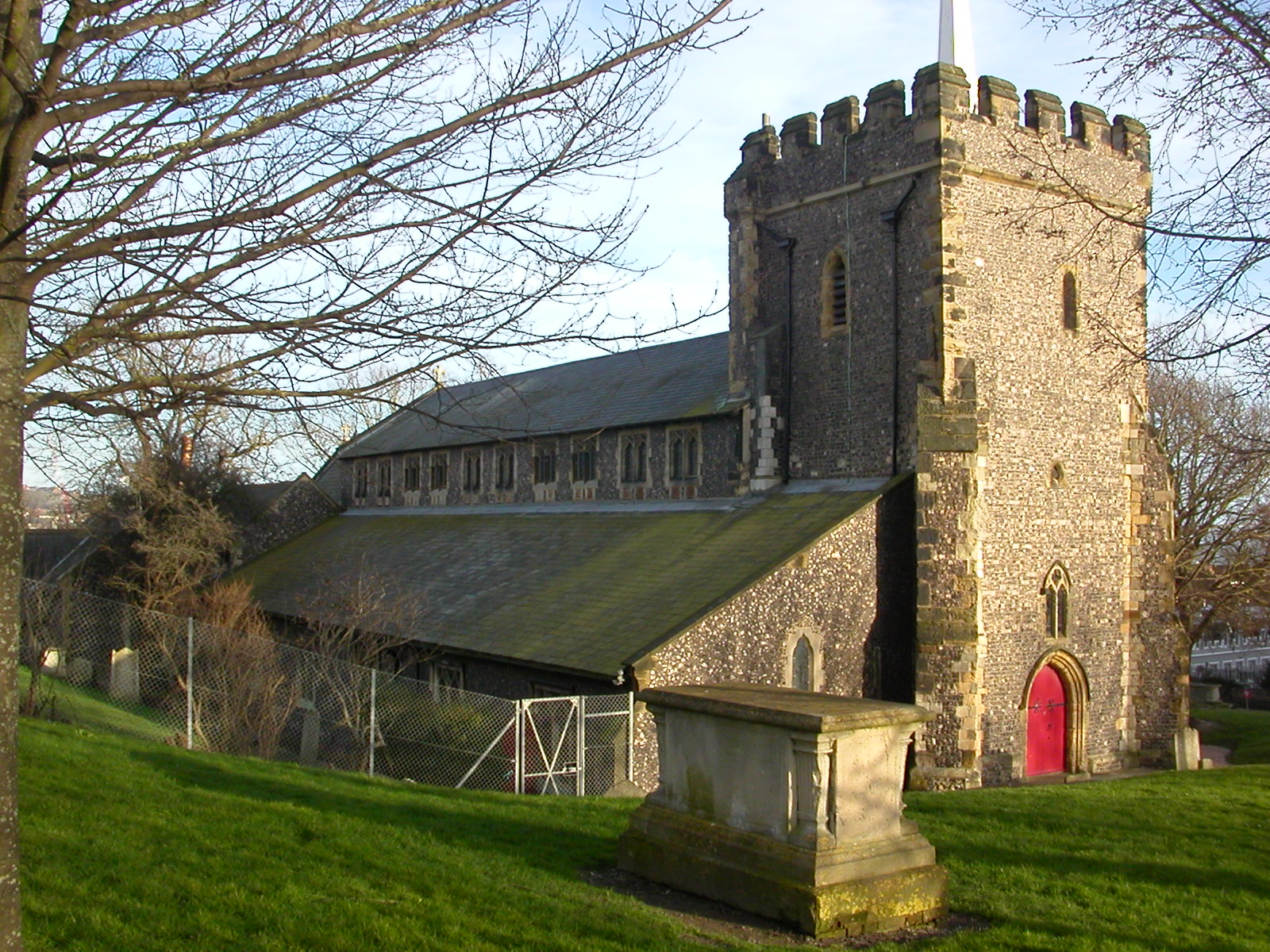
View of the northern and western sides

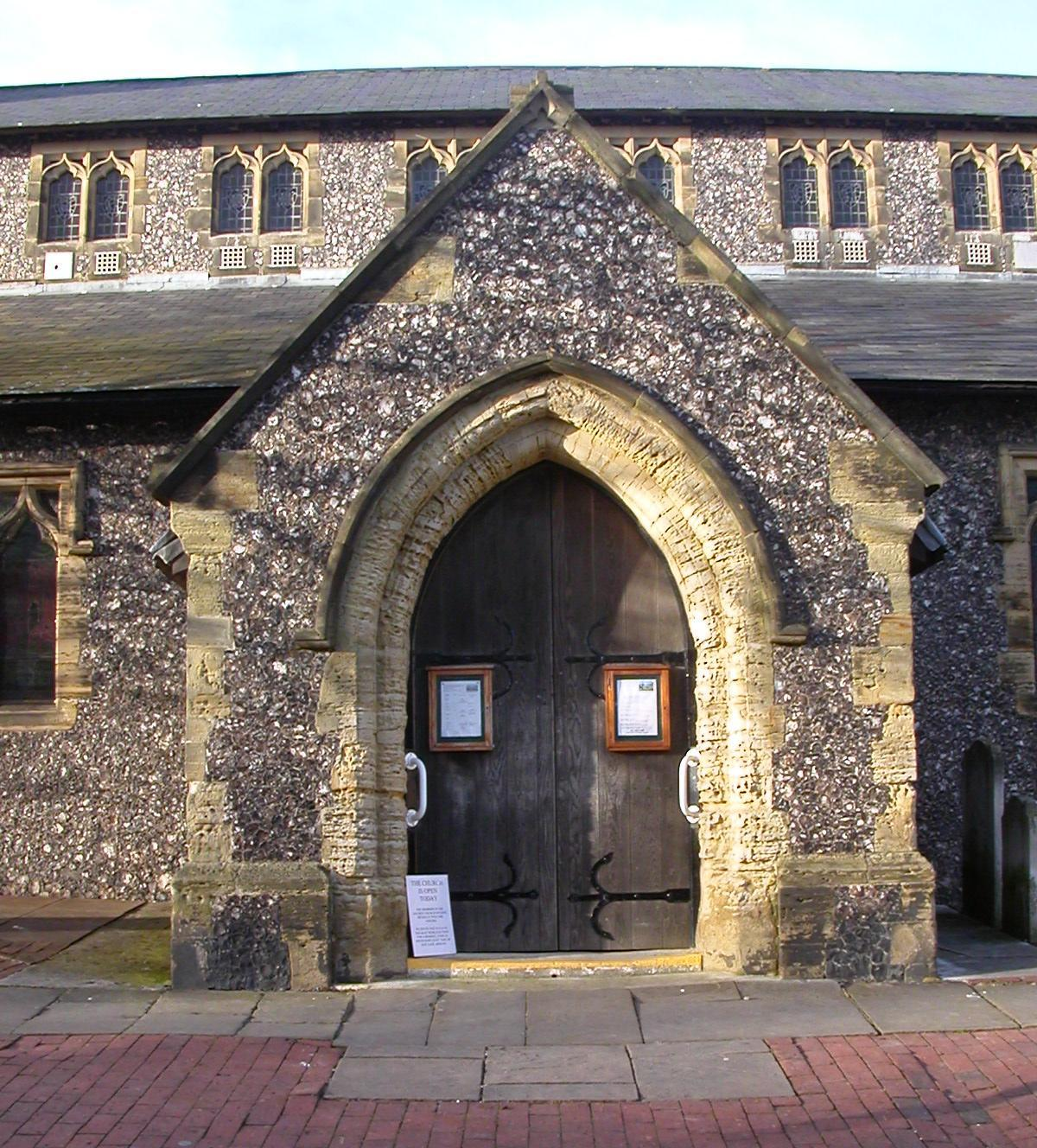
The south doorway

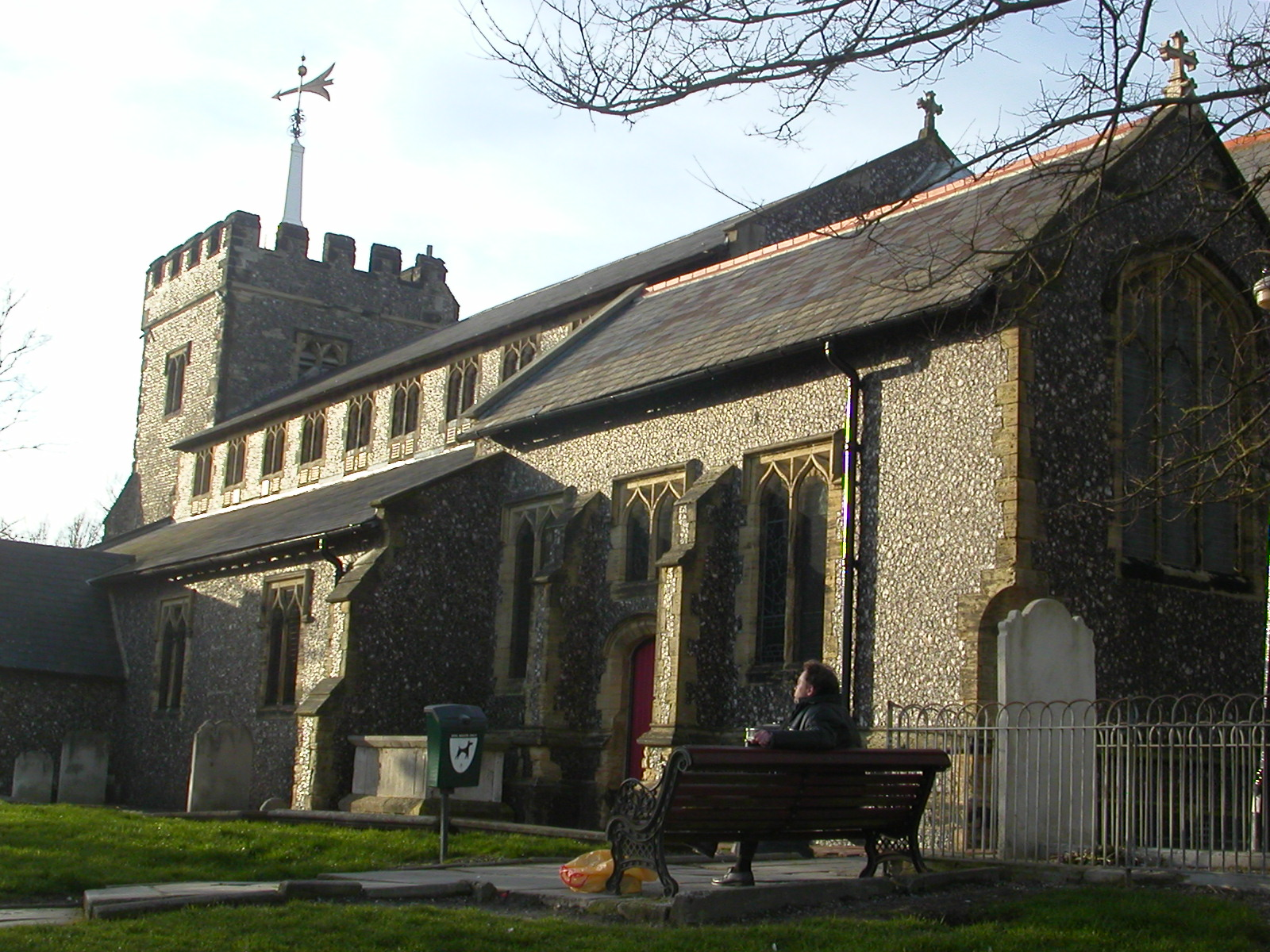
The south side of the church, showing the clerestory windows dating from 1892

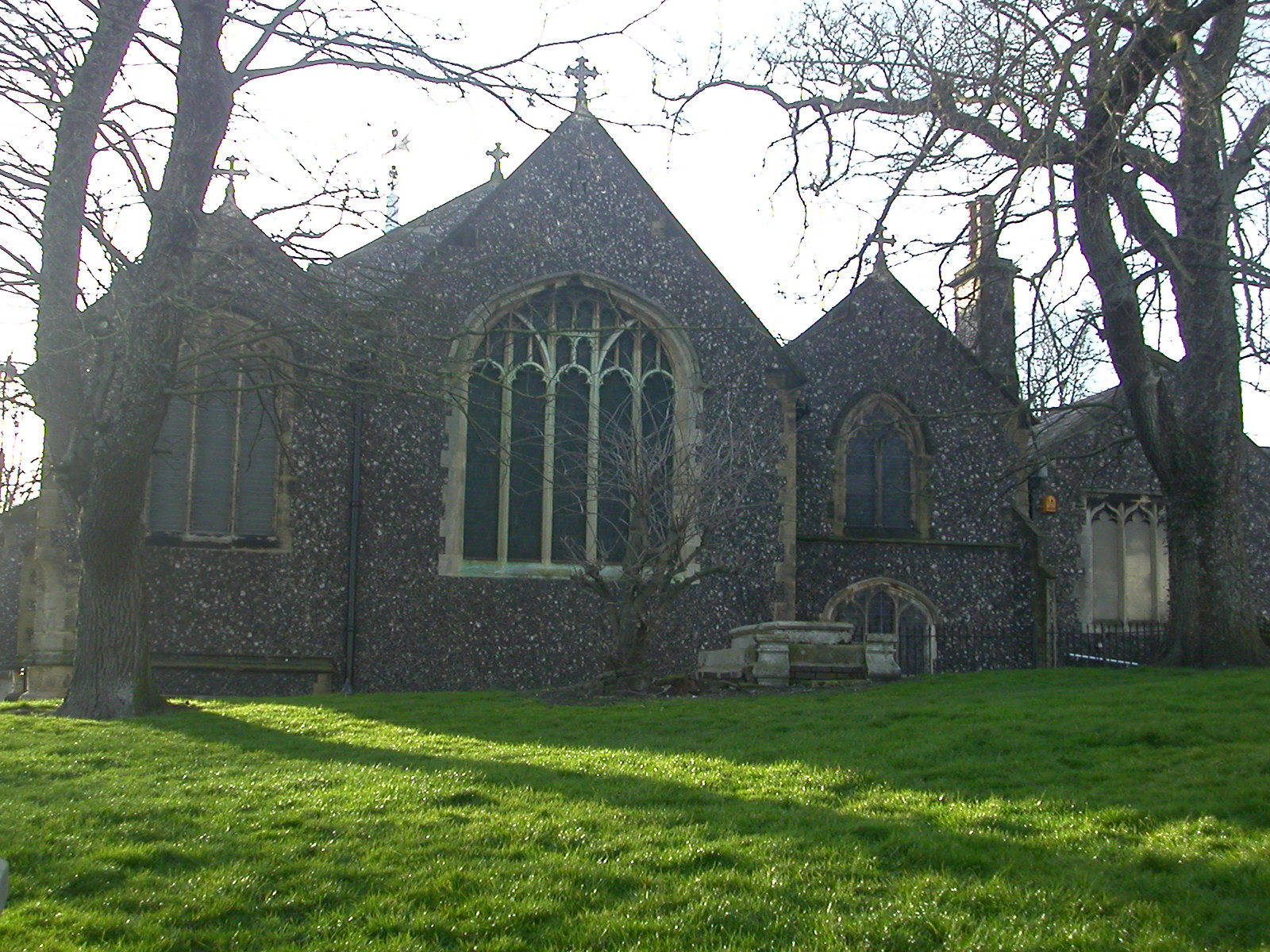
The Perpendicular east window

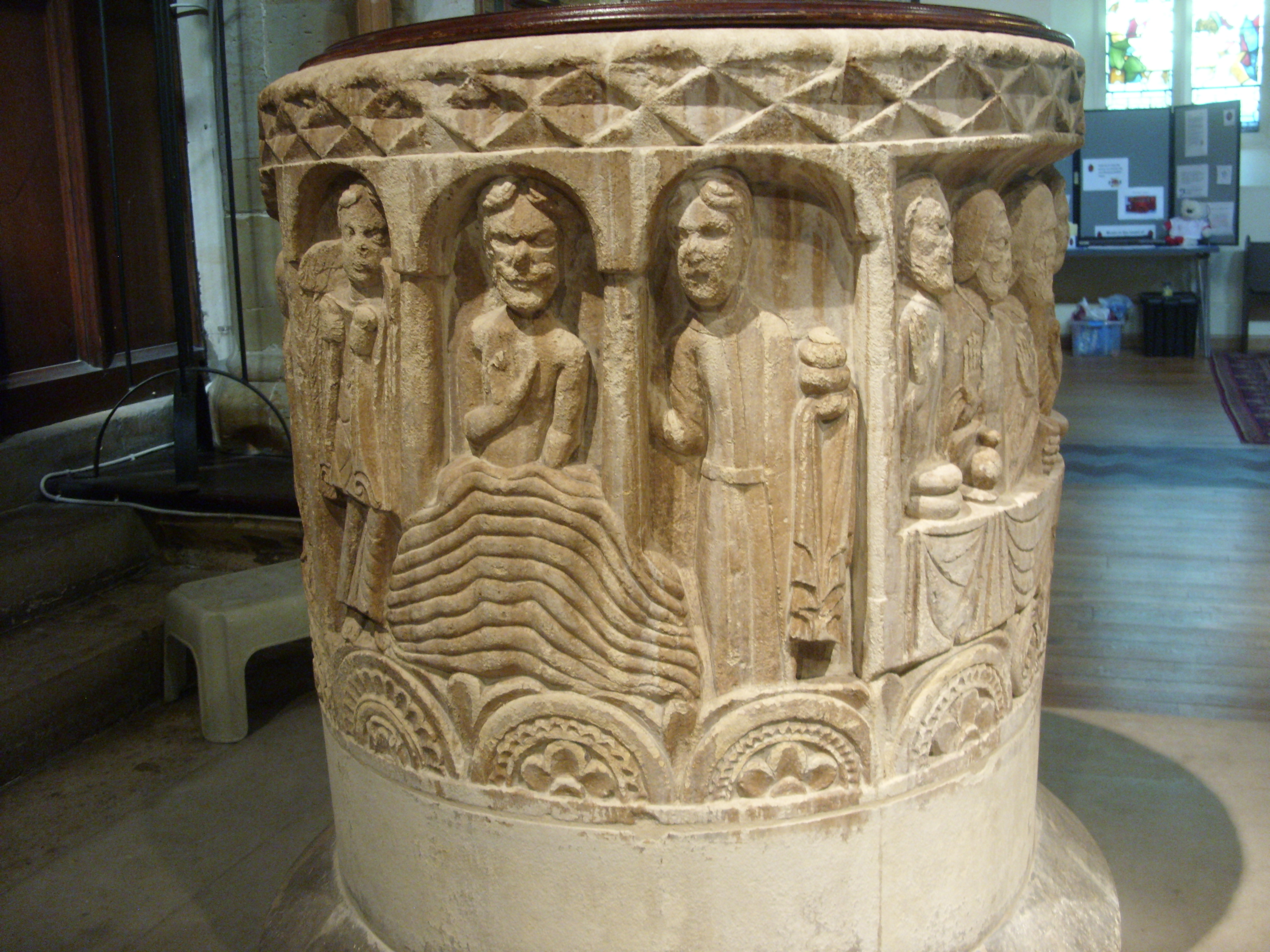
The font

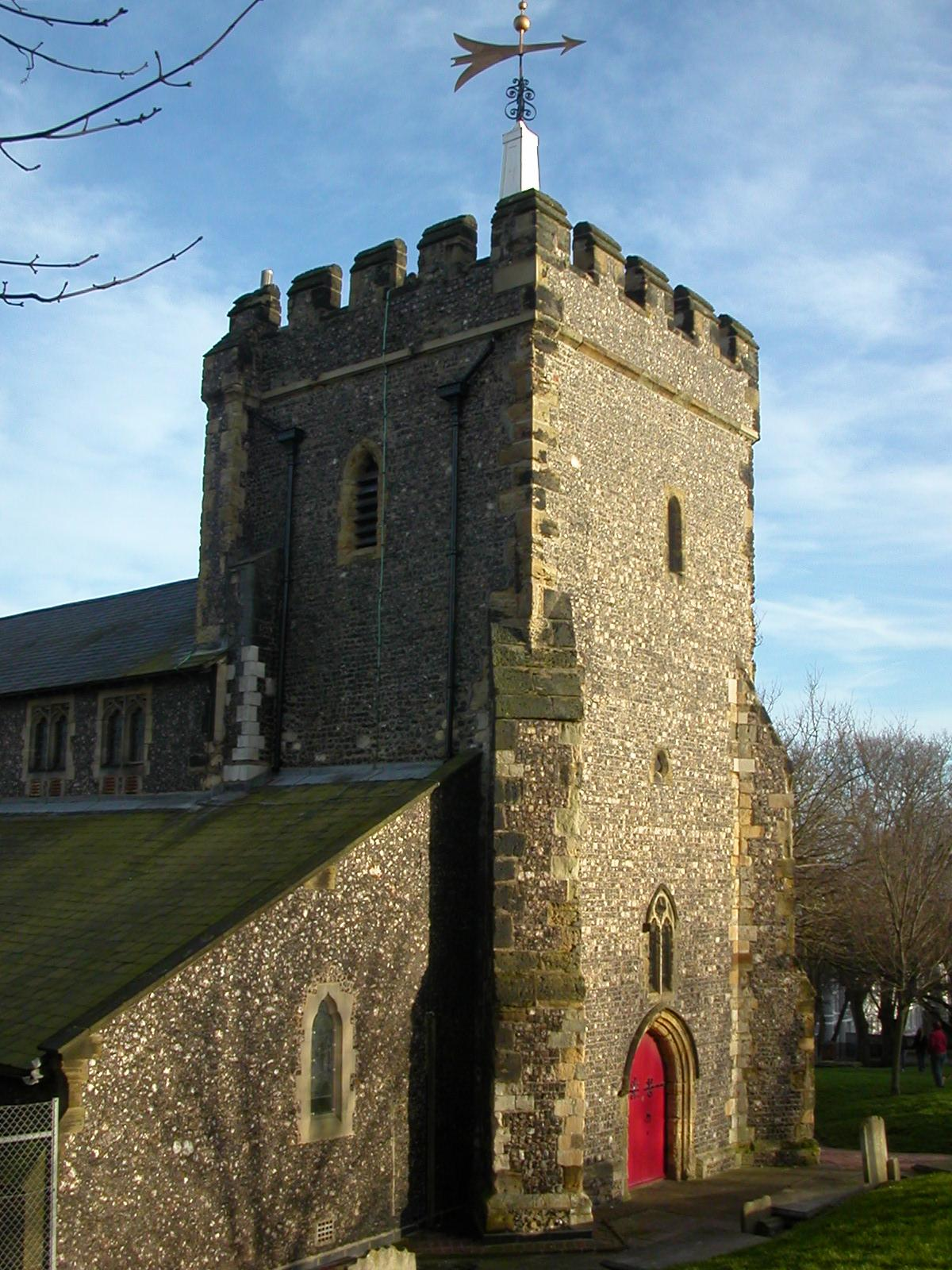
View of the tower from the northwestern side

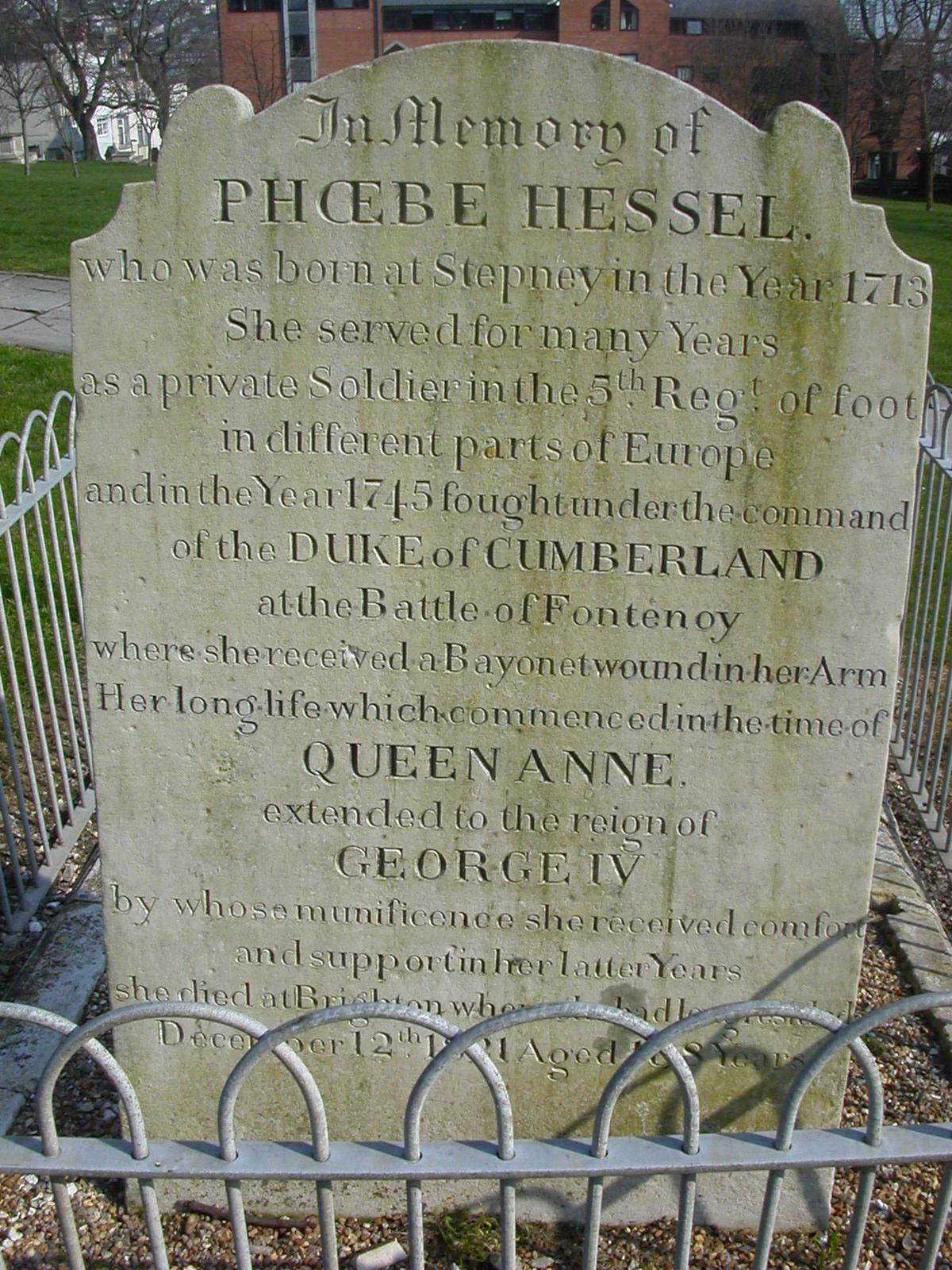
Phoebe Hessel's tombstone

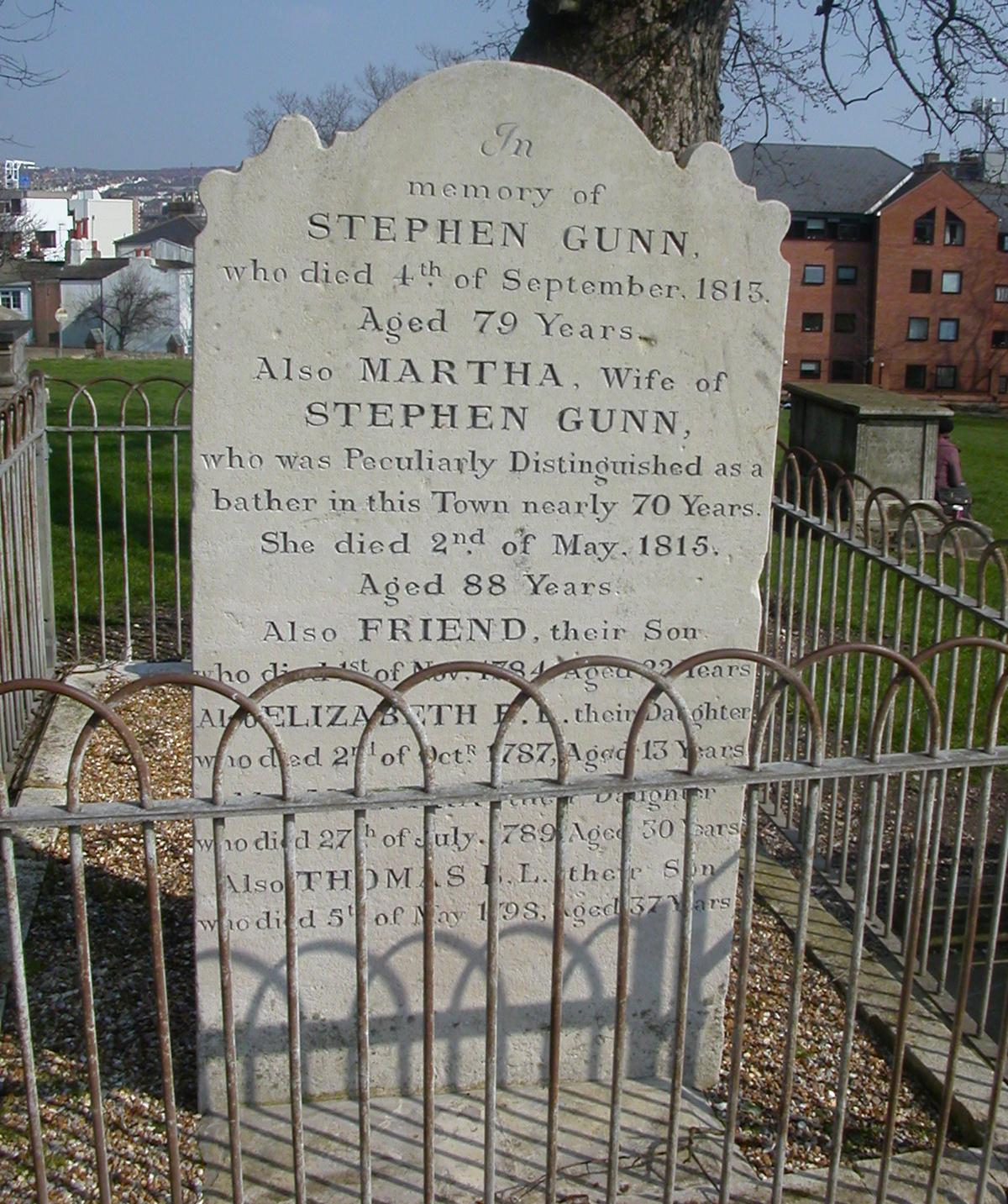
Martha Gunn's tombstone

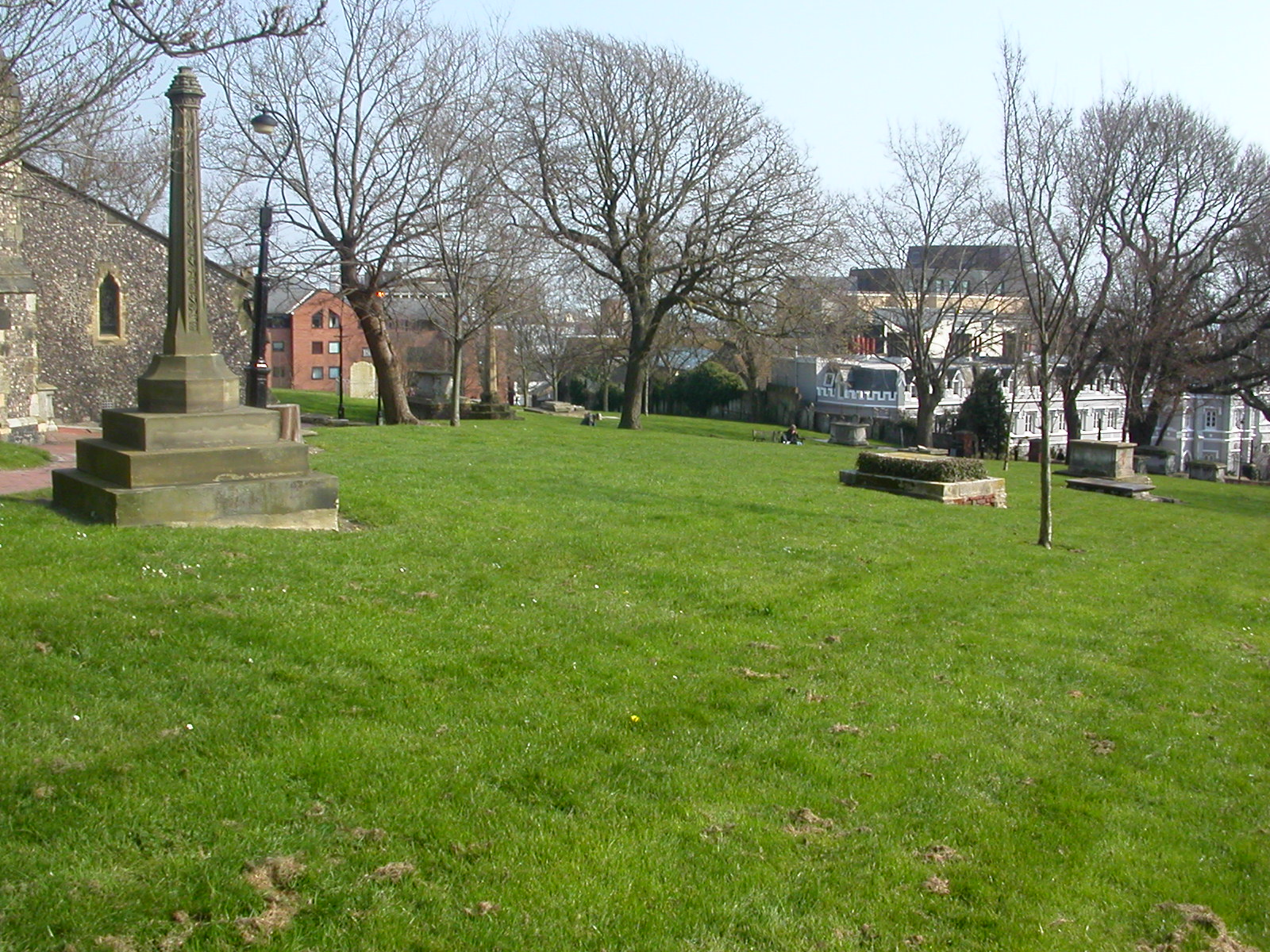
View across the original churchyard

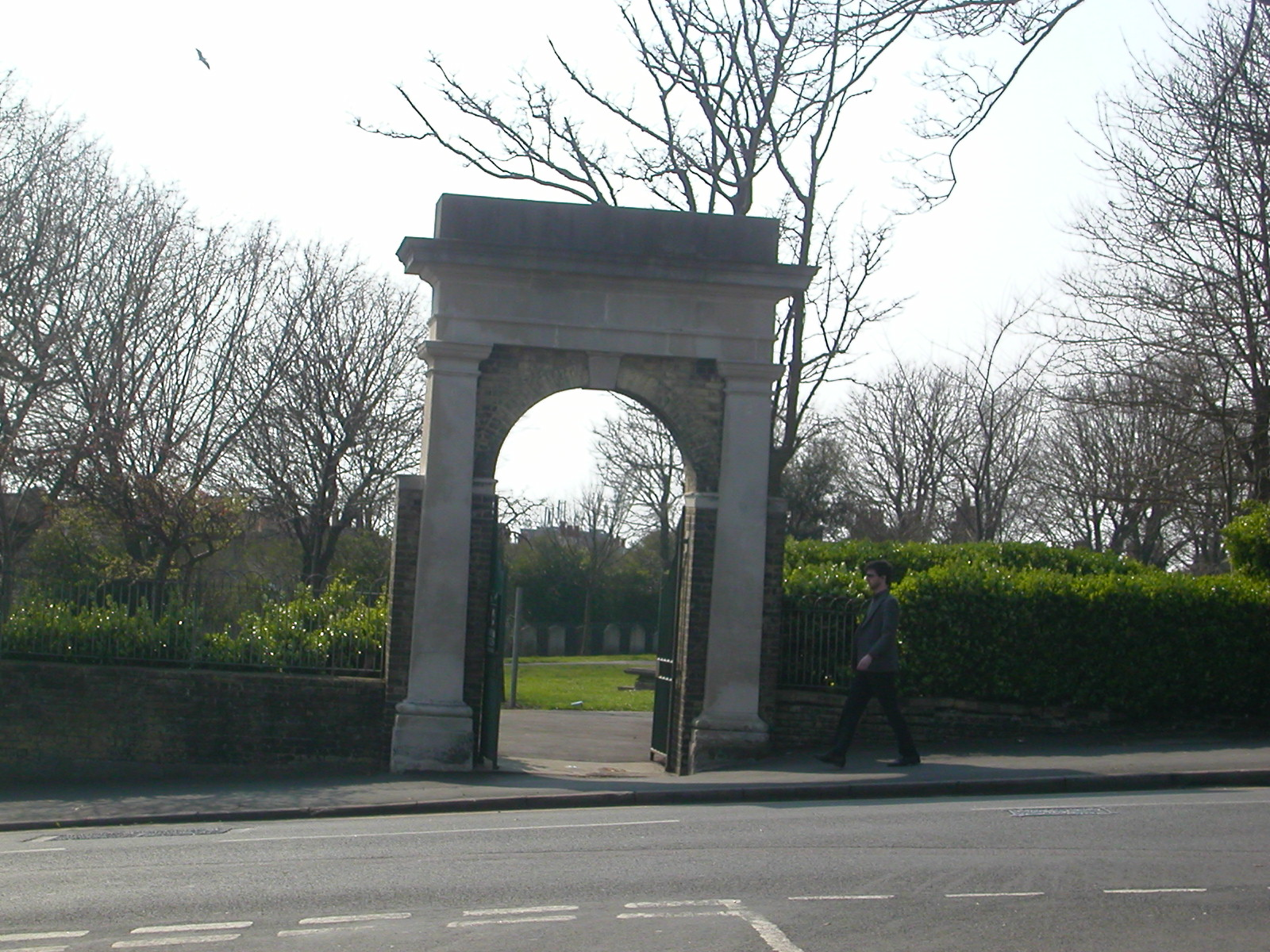
The 1841 burial ground

== See also ==
- Cemeteries and crematoria in Brighton and Hove
- List of places of worship in Brighton and Hove
- List of works by R. C. Carpenter
