= Mappin & Webb =

British silversmith and jewellery company

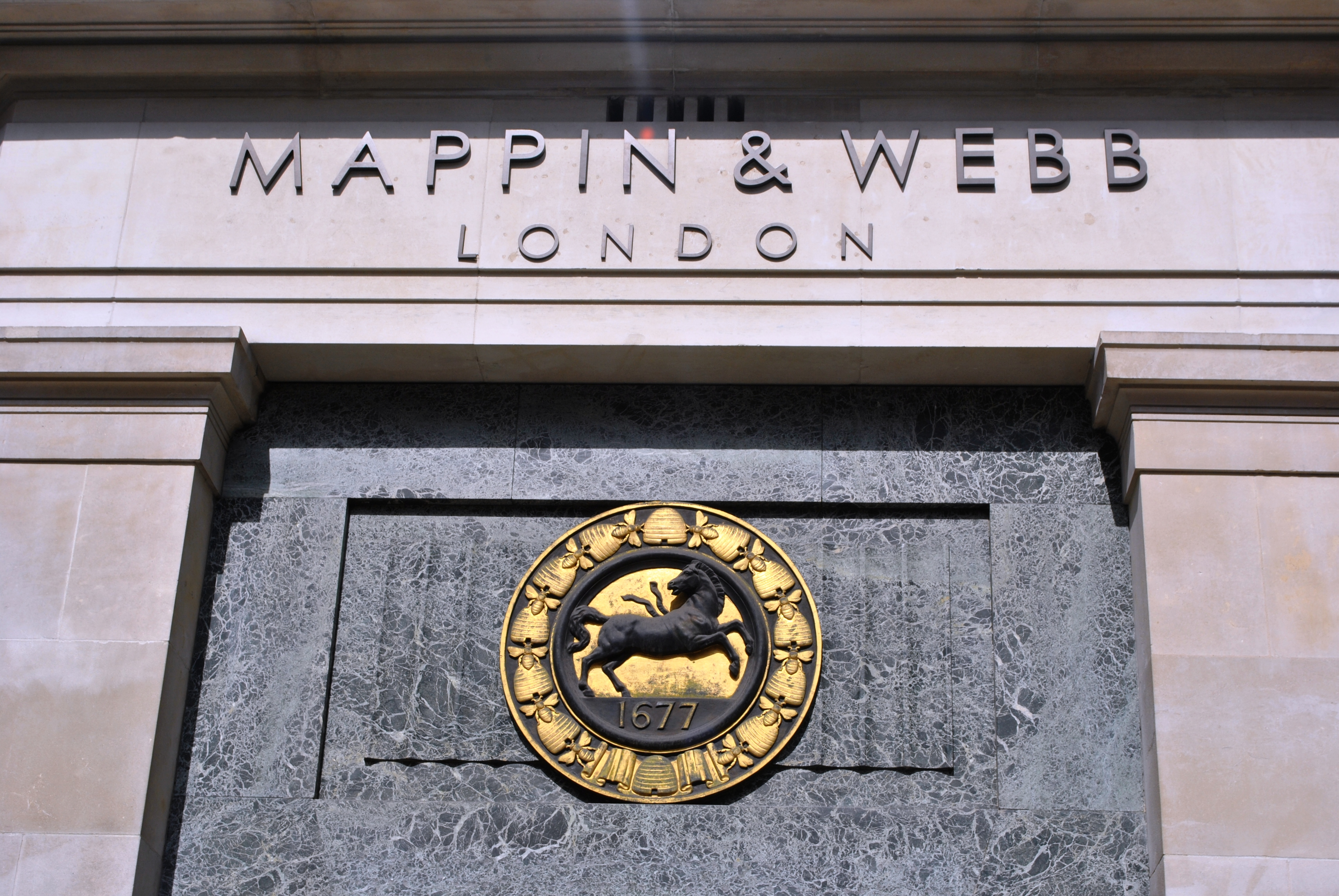
- Mappin & Webb, Oxford Street, London
- Formerly: Mappin Brothers
- Industry: Jewellery
- Founded: 1775; 251 years ago in Sheffield, England
- Founder: Jonathan Mappin
- Headquarters: London
- Products: Jewellery
- Owner: Watches of Switzerland Group PLC
- Website: www.mappinandwebb.com

Mappin & Webb is an international jewellery company headquartered in England, tracing its origins to a silver workshop founded in Sheffield in 1775; 251 years ago. It now has retail stores throughout the UK.

Mappin & Webb has held Royal Warrants to British monarchs since 1897. The company's master craftsman Mark Appleby is the current Crown Jeweller of the United Kingdom.

== History ==
Mappin & Webb traces its origins to 1775, when Jonathan Mappin opened a silver workshop in Sheffield, then as now a major centre of the English silver trade. The business eventually became Mappin Brothers.

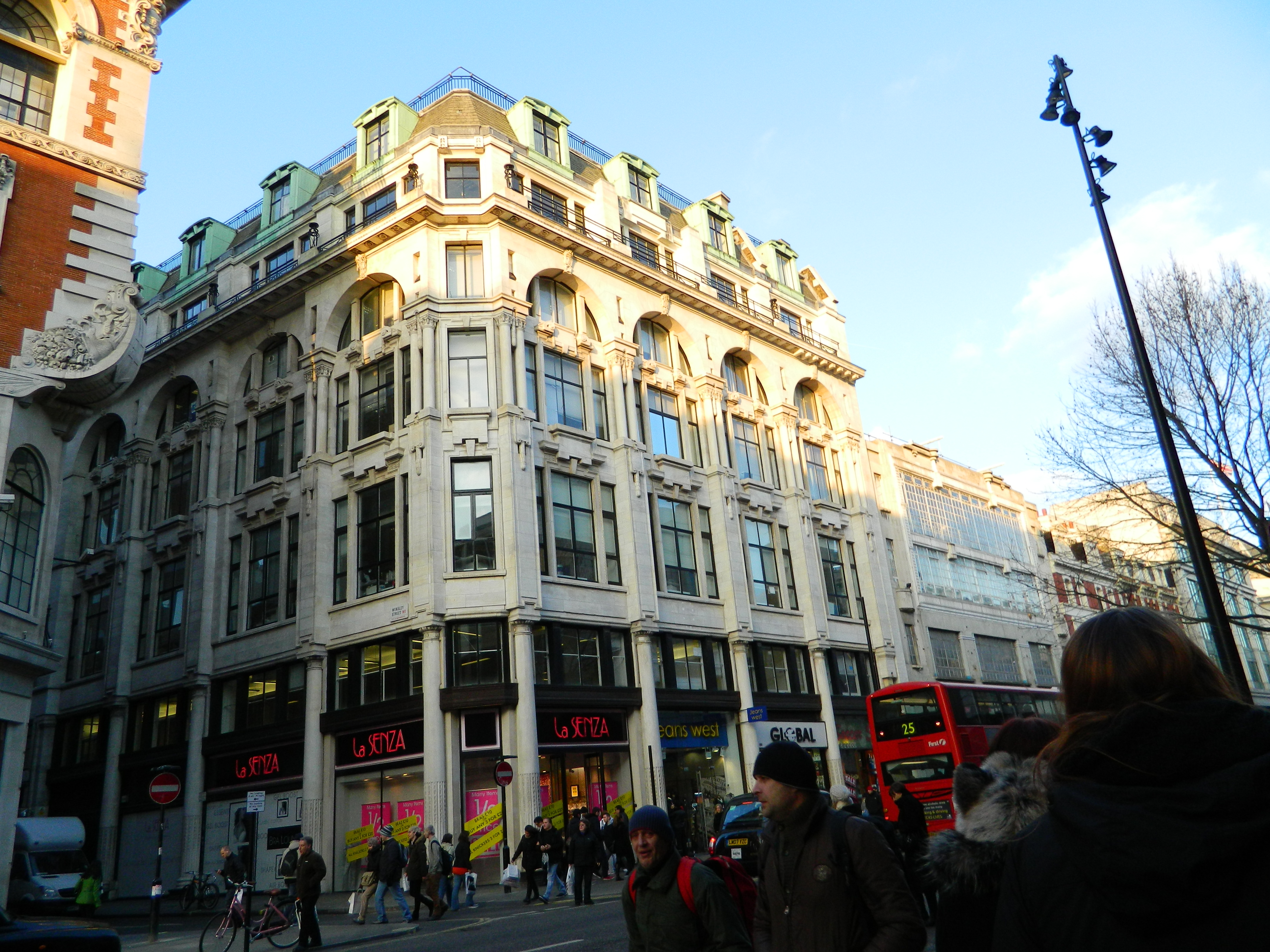
Mappin House on Oxford Street, as rebuilt in 1906–1908

One of Jonathan Mappin's great-grandsons, John Mappin, started his own business in London, Mappin & Company, in 1860, which became Mappin, Webb & Co. in 1862 after John Mappin was joined by his brother-in-law George Webb. The first Mappin & Webb store opened in 1860 at 77–78 Oxford Street (Mappin House), London (renumbered 160–162 in 1880), and the company's candelabras, fine silverware, and vanity products swiftly gained renown. As a natural progression from silverware, Mappin & Webb began designing jewellery.

In 1870, they built a showroom in the City of London on Poultry. In 1903, Mappin, Webb & Co. acquired Mappin Brothers. Three years later the premises on Oxford Street were rebuilt to designs by Belcher & Joass. Joass also rebuilt the Regent Street store (inherited from Mappin Brothers), in 1914.

In 1926, the company had trading difficulties and had to reduce its capital by 50%. However, in 1929, the Oxford Street store was further expanded to add number 156, becoming 156-162 Oxford Street.

By the 1950s, the Regent Street store was proving more successful than the Oxford Street store with the company claiming that that particular part of Oxford Street was no longer suitable for their class of business, and in 1956 the company closed its showrooms in Oxford Street. They retained the property and their headquarters on Oxford Street but let out the store to another company. They announced the same year that they had acquired a new showroom on Brompton Road in Knightsbridge.

Starting in 1956 they started to diversify, acquiring surgical instrument manufacturer John Weiss & Son, and controlling interests in the Pinking Shear Company and Belfast-based linen manufacturer, Robinson & Cleaver. Robinson & Cleaver held a Royal Warrant as linen drapers to Queen Elizabeth II. In 1957 and 1958, they further expanded, acquiring plate and cutlery manufacturer, Gladwin Limited of Sheffield and then, via John Weiss, a 50% interest in dispensing chemist, Lewis & Burrows.

Mappin & Webb expanded internationally, beginning in the 1890s. Its first overseas store was established in Johannesburg, and stores soon followed in Buenos Aires, Rio de Janeiro, São Paulo, Biarritz, Hong Kong, Shanghai, Cairo, and Bombay. Mappin & Webb built their own property in Johannesburg in 1915 and it was a city landmark. Due to import controls imposed in South Africa, the Johannesburg showrooms were closed in 1959. Later in 1959, Mappin & Webb announced a loss for 1958, partly due to heavy foreign exchange losses, leading to the decision to curtail overseas trading and close branches in a number of other countries. Subsequently, all international stores closed in the second half of the 20th century.

Around the time of the announcement of the poor results in 1958, it was announced that Sears had gained control of the company through the acquisition of shares from a number of shareholders, via the stock market and also through private negotiations. Following the change of control, in October 1959, Mappin & Webb bought Garrard & Co, the Crown Jeweller, for almost £1 million.

In 1960, Lewis & Burrows was sold to Clinical Industries Limited and Selim Zilkha.

In 1963, Mappin & Webb and three other old-established cutlery and silverware firms, Elkington (owned by Delta Metal), Walker & Hall and Adie Brothers, grouped together to form British Silverware Limited.

Mappin & Webb has created jewellery for royalty and high society; both in the United Kingdom, and internationally. Patrons have included Queen of France Marie-Antoinette, the Empress of Russia, and Princess Grace of Monaco. The company historically held Royal Warrants to both the Russian Empire and the Japanese Royal Household. Queen Victoria was the first British monarch to commission Mappin & Webb. Victoria's Golden Jubilee necklace was created by the house in 1888, and was designated by the Queen as an heirloom of the Crown. Mappin & Webb has held Royal Warrants in the UK since 1897.

Mappin & Webb has held warrants to Queen Elizabeth II, King Charles III and Queen Camilla.Mappin & Webb's master craftsman Martin Swift was appointed in 2012 to the position of Crown Jeweller, the custodian of the British Crown Jewels who is responsible for preparing them for the State Opening of Parliament and other state occasions. Appleby, also of Mappin & Webb, took over as crown jeweller in 2017. For the 2023 coronation, the historic Crown of Queen Mary was modified for Queen Camilla by Mappin & Webb.

Mappin & Webb produced the original Ryder Cup trophy, and made trophies for the Royal Ascot horse races for 75 years.

== Ownership ==
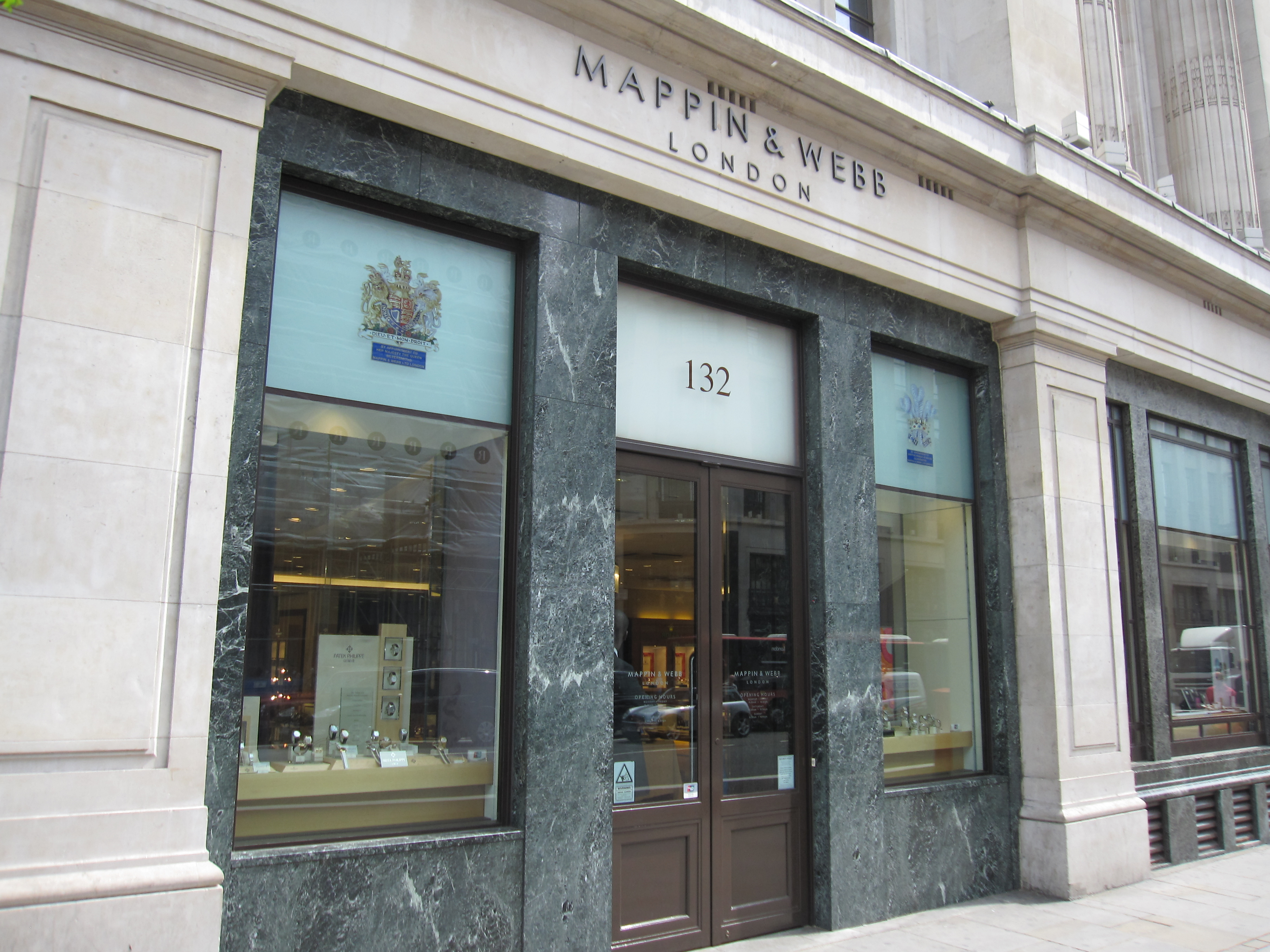
Mappin & Webb on Regent Street in London (2011)

In August 1959, Sears Holdings Ltd increased their ownership in Mappin & Webb to 98%, after earlier acquiring a controlling interest. In July 1990, Sears sold the company to Asprey plc in exchange for shares in Asprey, giving Sears a 38.5% interest in the expanded group. In December 1998 managing director Judith Pilkington acquired the company from Asprey, together with Watches of Switzerland. It was then acquired by the Icelandic Baugur Group in November 2005. In December 2006, Mappin & Webb, together with Watches of Switzerland, were acquired by Goldsmiths, which was also owned by the Baugur Group. On 2 February 2009, the business and assets of Mappin & Webb were transferred to the Aurum Group (previously known as Goldsmiths). Baugur became insolvent and went into administration in early 2009. In 2013, the group headed by Aurum Holdings, which included the company and Aurum Group, was acquired by an investment fund affiliated with Apollo Global Management. In 2018, Aurum Holdings was renamed the Watches of Switzerland Group, which was floated on the London Stock Exchange in 2019.

== City of London branch ==
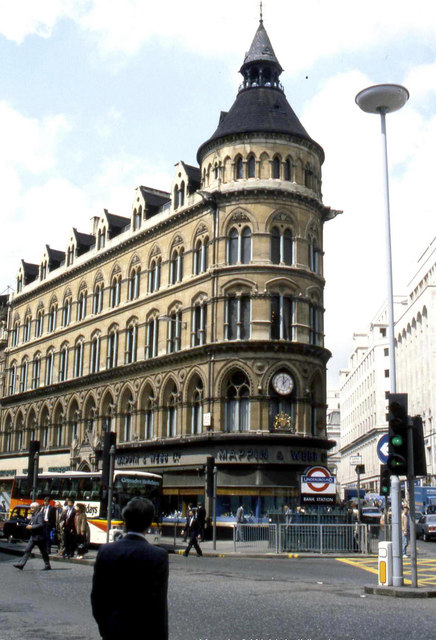
The former Mappin & Webb building at Bank, pictured in 1993

A branch of Mappin & Webb once occupied a prominent location in the City of London at the junction of Poultry and Queen Victoria Street, adjacent to Bank junction. Designed in the neo-Gothic style by John Belcher in 1870, the listed building was demolished in 1994 to make way for the construction of a postmodern office and retail building, No 1 Poultry, despite a campaign to save the 19th-century building.

== In popular culture ==
In the Jules Dassin film noir production Rififi of 1955, a gang execute an ill-fated heist on a Mappin & Webb jewellery store in Paris.
