= Mappin House =

Building in Oxford Street, London

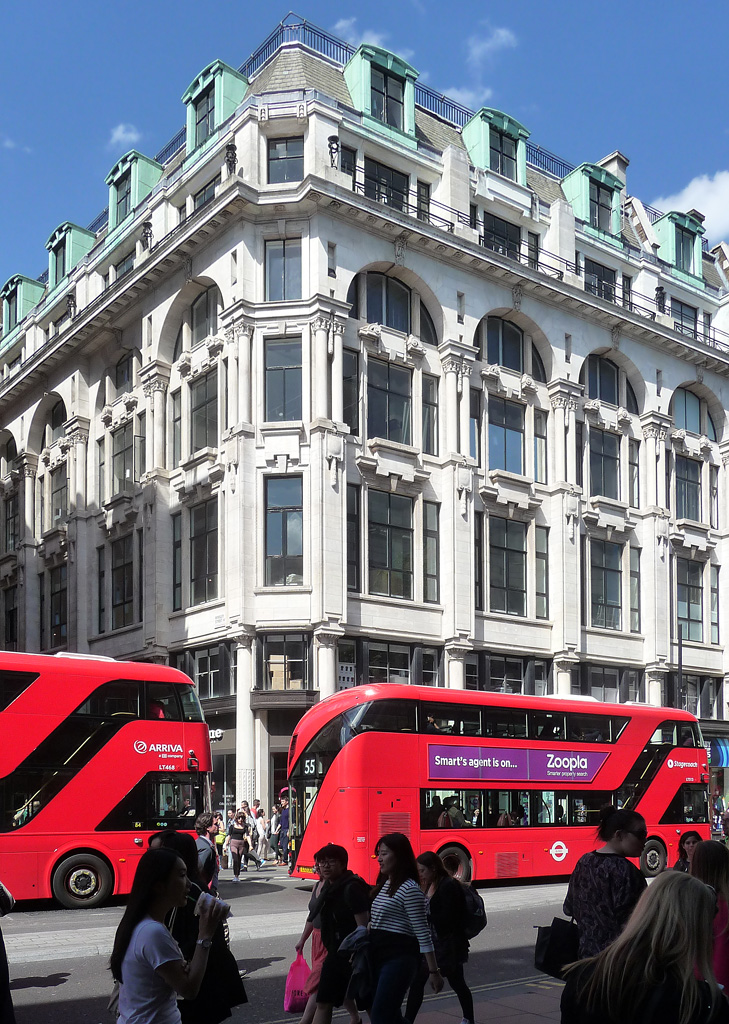
- Interactive map of the Mappin House area

General information
- Type: Commercial
- Architectural style: Mannerism and Edwardian Baroque
- Location: Oxford Street, London, England
- Coordinates: 51°30′57″N 0°08′18″W
- Completed: 1908

Design and construction
- Architect: John James Joass alongside nominal credit to John Belcher

Listed Building – Grade II*
- Official name: 156-162, OXFORD STREET W1
- Designated: 21 August 1975
- Reference no.: 1357395

Mappin House is a Grade II* listed building on Oxford Street which formerly housed a major branch of the Mappin & Webb jewellery company.

== History ==
Mappin & Webb emerged after John Newton Mappin had left the Mappin Brothers and created it with his brother-in-law George Webb. They adopted new premises in London, the site of the current Mappin House. Mappin & Webb began operating on Oxford Street from 1860. Their London premises saw see alterations in 1867 and expansions in the 19th century to encompass the modern addresses 156-162 Oxford Street.

In 1903, Mappin & Web absorbed the Mappin Brothers company and look to rebuild their Oxford Street location. John Belcher and his chief assistant then partner J. J. Joass were tasked with its design, which Joass did in almost its entirety. The building was completed in 1908 and for its associations with the jewellers retains the name Mappin House.

Rear expansions were made in both 1912 and 1936, as well as the facade extended in 1929.

Mappin & Webb leased the shop space in 1956 due to the greater popularity of their Regent Street location and continue using the building for its head offices until the company was sold to Sears Holdings in 1959.

== Architecture ==
The building is of a renaissance and Edwardian baroque design. It exhibits weighty upper portions with steel framing, an early example in London, allowing for slender Doric columns.

The facing is entirely in Pentelic marble, possibly making it the first building in Britain to do so.
