= Phoebe Hessel =

British wartime cross-dresser

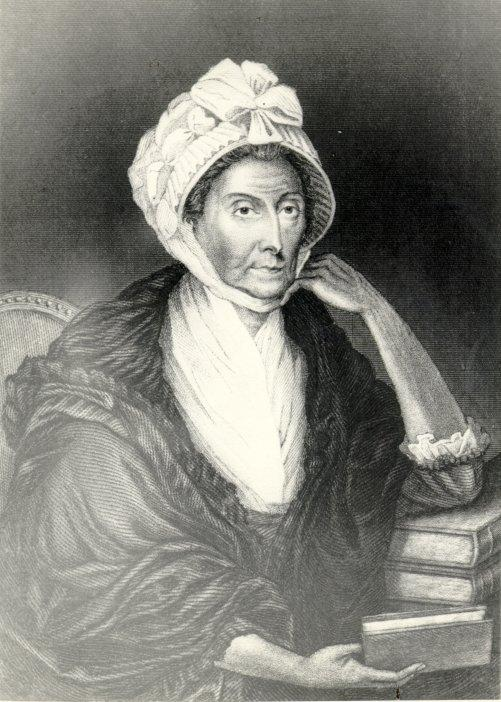
Phoebe Hessel

Phoebe Hessel, née Smith (March 1713 – 12 December 1821) was best known for disguising herself as a man to serve in the British Army, probably to be with her lover, Samuel Golding. She lived to the age of 108.

== Biography ==
Phoebe Hessel was born Phoebe Smith, in Stepney, and was baptised at the local church, St Dunstan's, on 13 April 1713. Some sources indicate that her father was a soldier who took her with him when she was a child. She enlisted in the 5th Regiment of Foot to serve alongside her lover, and served as a soldier in the West Indies and Gibraltar. Both remained in the British Army, and fought and were wounded in the Battle of Fontenoy in 1745. Finally, she revealed her position to the wife of the Regiment's colonel, and they were both discharged and married. According to a sergeant of the regiment, her sex was revealed when she was undressed to be whipped, upon which she only commented: "Strike and be damned!" She was given no punishment, and had her salary paid out as any other soldier.

They lived in Plymouth, where they had nine children, of whom eight died in infancy, and the survivor died at sea. After Golding died, she moved to Brighton to marry fisherman Thomas Hessel. He died when she was 80 years old. She supported herself by selling fish in and around Brighton, and her evidence was instrumental in securing the conviction and execution of highwayman James Rooke.

In old age, she sold small items, such as oranges and gingerbread, on a street corner near the Brighton Pavilion. She became well known in Brighton, due to her great age and unusual experiences. She was forced into the workhouse, but was granted a pension of half a guinea a week by the Prince of Wales (future George IV) in 1808. She attended his coronation parade in Brighton in 1820.

She died on 12 December 1821, aged 108. She was buried in the graveyard of St Nicholas Church, Brighton.

She was sometimes referred to as the 'Stepney Amazon'; Amazon Street and Hessel Street (both named in her honour) still exist today in Stepney (now part of the London Borough of Tower Hamlets).

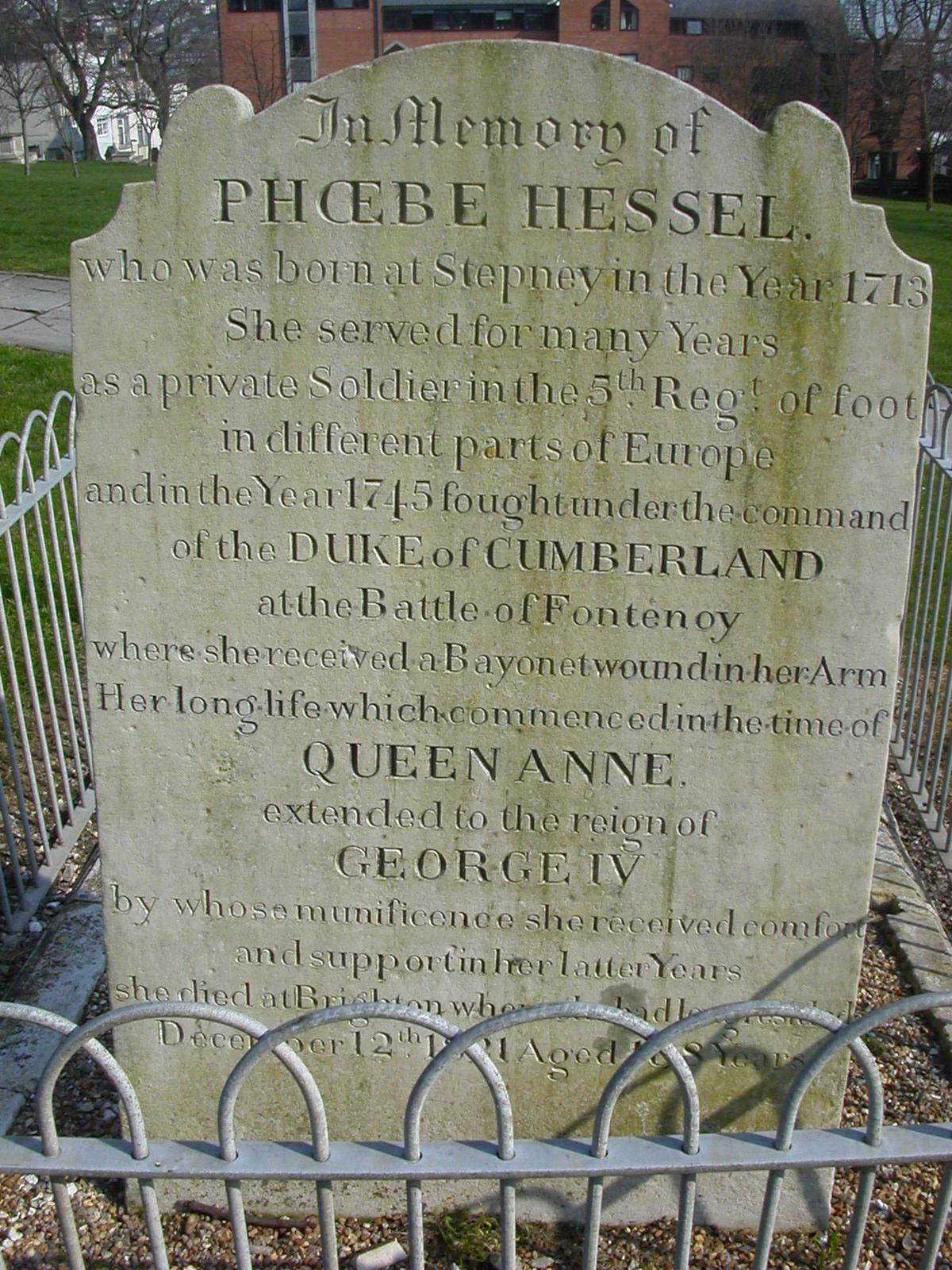
Phoebe Hessel's gravestone at St Nicholas Church, Brighton
