= Martha Gunn =

British dipper (1726–1815)

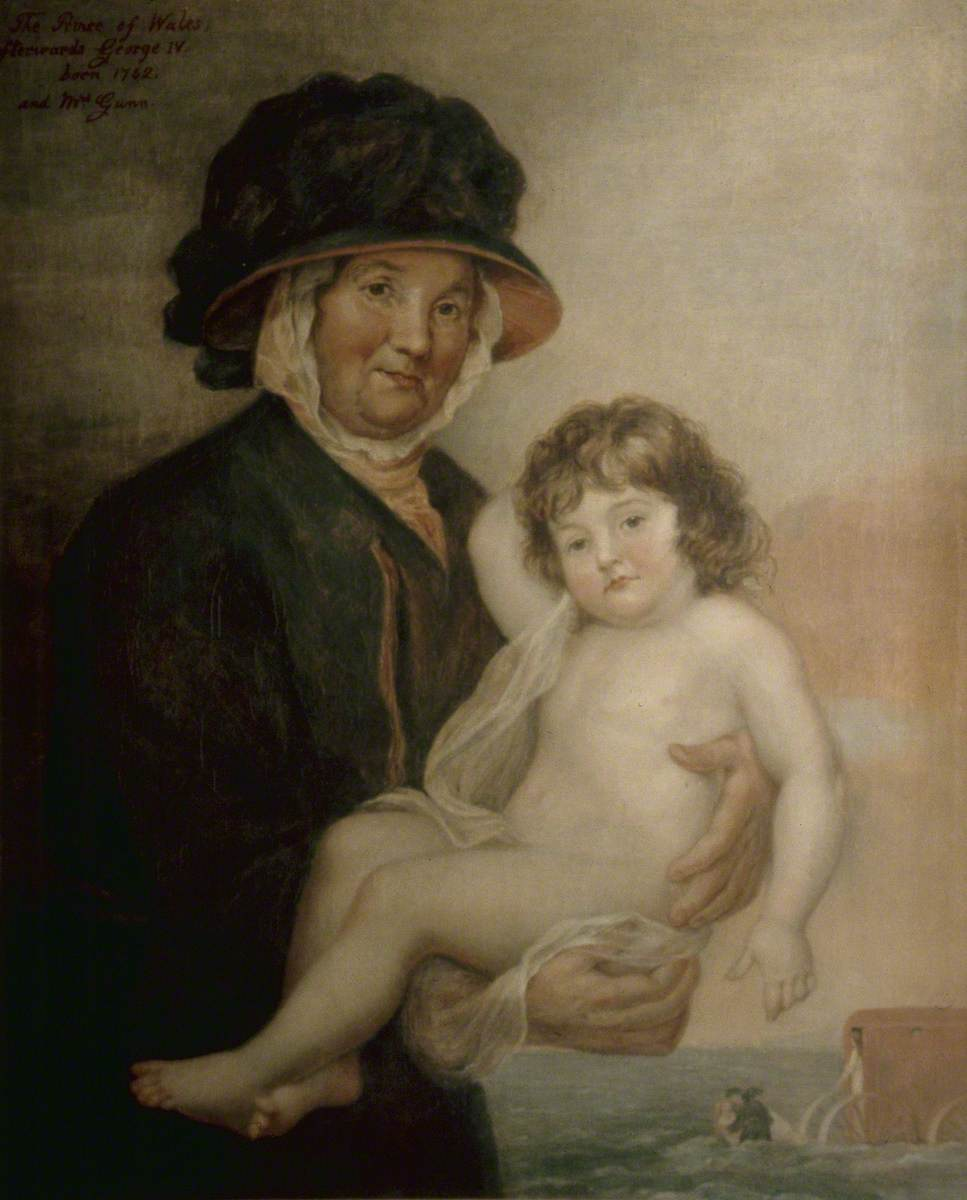
"Martha Gunn and the Prince of Wales", painted by John Russell

Martha Gunn (born Martha Killick; 1726 – 1815) was the most famous bathing machine operator (or "dipper") in the English seaside resort of Brighton.

Killick married Stephen Gunn in 1758, and they had eight children. Many of their descendants still live in Brighton. Stephen's sister Abigail married John "Smoaker" Miles, the most famous bather at the time. Martha lived at 34 or 36 East Street, Brighton, in a house that still stands. Her grave stone stands in St Nicholas' churchyard in Brighton.

The Morning Herald described Martha Gunn as "The Venerable Priestess of the Bath".

== Profession ==
A dipper was the operator of a bathing machine used by women bathers. The dipper pushed the machine into and out of the water and helped the bather into and out of the water. A dipper had to be large and strong to carry out this work and Martha Gunn fulfilled both requirements. The male equivalent was called a bather.

== Fame and notoriety ==
Martha Gunn was well known in the town and also known across the country. Her image appeared in many popular engravings including one in which she appeared repelling the invading French with a mop. In another she is seen standing behind Mrs Fitzherbert and The Prince of Wales (the future George IV).

Martha Gunn was said to be a favourite of the Prince of Wales and had free access to the royal kitchens.

== Legacy ==
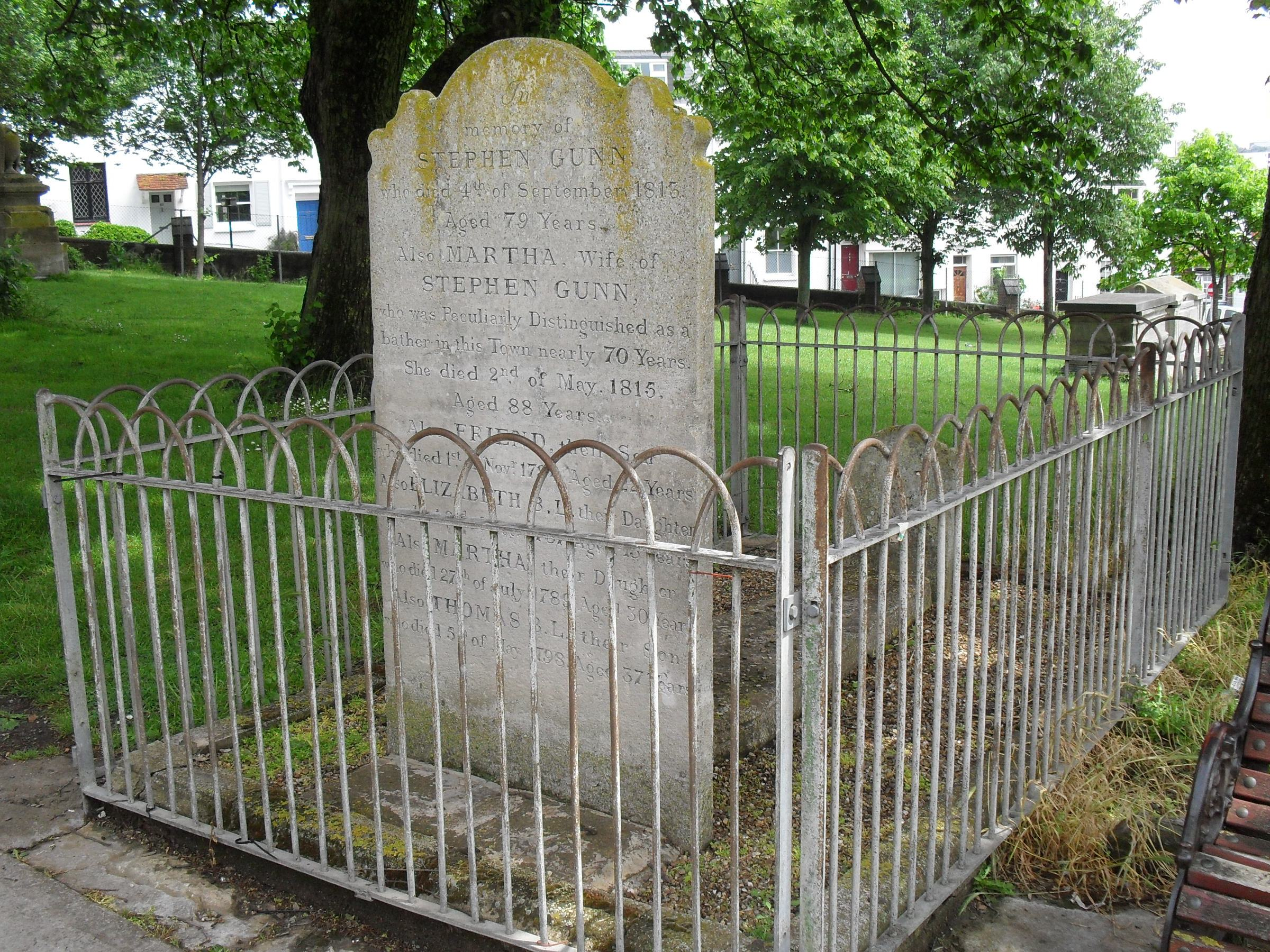
Gunn's grave

Several works of art show the image of Martha Gunn. An undated painting by John Russell titled "Martha Gunn and the Prince Of Wales" is unlikely to actually show the Prince of Wales as he did not visit Brighton until he was twenty-one, and Martha Gunn herself is not thought to have ever left Brighton. The original of this painting now hangs in the tea-room of the Royal Pavilion.

Her image is on several contemporary engravings and cartoons and a toby jug was made of her in 1840.

There is a pub in Upper Lewes Road, Brighton called the Martha Gunn and she has a Brighton & Hove bus named after her. The Brighton-based pop group Martha Gunn also take their name from her.

== Rhyme ==
To Brighton came he,
Came George III's son.
To be bathed in the sea,
By famed Martha Gunn.

(Old English rhyme, author unknown)
