= Bathing machine =

Device used for sea bathing during the 19th century

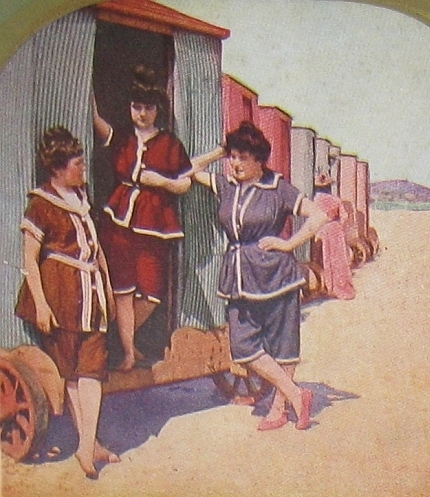
Women posing near a bathing machine in 1902

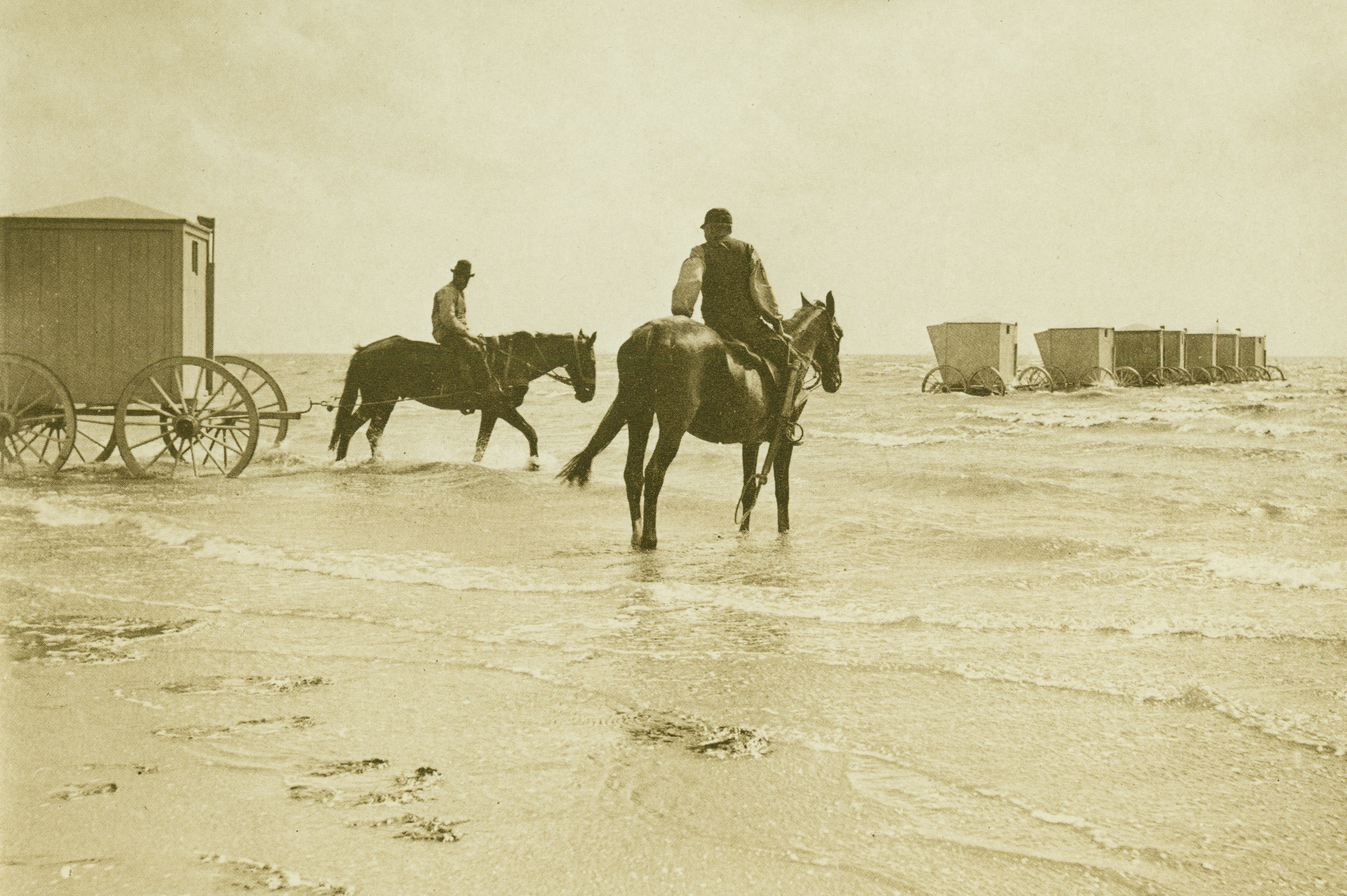
Horse-drawn bathing machines in Wyk auf Föhr, Germany, 1895

The bathing machine was a device, popular from the 18th century until the early 20th century, to allow people at beaches to change out of their usual clothes, change into swimwear, and wade in the ocean. Bathing machines were roofed and walled wooden carts that rolled into the sea. Some had solid wooden walls, others canvas walls over a wooden frame, and commonly walls at the sides and curtained doors at each end.

The use of bathing machines was part of the etiquette for sea-bathing to be observed by both men and women who wished to behave respectably.

Especially in Britain, even with the use of the machine to protect modesty, bathing for men and women was usually segregated, so that people of the opposite sex would not see each other in their bathing suits which, although modest by modern standards, were not considered proper clothing in which to be seen in public.

== Use ==
The bathing machines in use in Margate, Kent, were described by Walley Chamberlain Oulton in 1805 as:

[F]our-wheeled carriages, covered with canvas, and having at one end of them an umbrella of the same materials which is let down to the surface of the water, so that the bather descending from the machine by a few steps is concealed from the public view, whereby the most refined female is enabled to enjoy the advantages of the sea with the strictest delicacy.

People entered the small room of the machine while it was on the beach, wearing their street clothing. In the machine they changed into their bathing suit, although men were allowed to bathe nude until the 1860s, placing their street clothes into a raised compartment where they would remain dry.

Probably all bathing machines had small windows, but one writer in the Manchester Guardian of 26 May 1906 considered them "ill-lighted" and wondered why bathing machines were not improved with a skylight.

The machine would be wheeled or slid into the water. The most common machines had large wide wheels and were propelled in and out of the surf by a horse, or a pair of horses, with a driver. Less common were machines pushed in and out of the water by human power. Some resorts had wooden rails into the water for the wheels to roll on, and a few had bathing machines pulled in and out of the sea using cables propelled by a steam engine.

Once in the water, the occupants disembarked from the sea side down steps into the water. Many machines had doors front and back; those with only one door would be backed into the sea or need to be turned around. It was considered essential that the machine blocked any view of the bather from the shore. Some machines were equipped with a canvas tent lowered from the seaside door, sometimes capable of being lowered to the water, giving the bather greater privacy.

Some resorts employed a dipper, a strong person of the same sex who would assist the bather in and out of the sea. Some dippers were said to push bathers into the water, then yank them out, considered part of the experience.

Bathing machines would often be equipped with a small flag which could be raised by the bather as a signal to the driver that they were ready to return to shore.

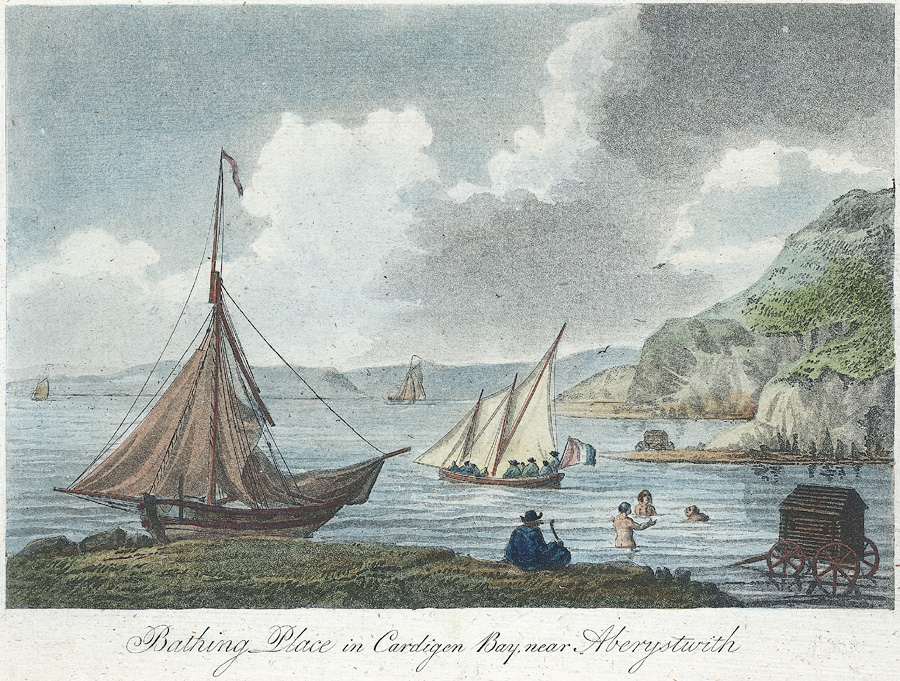
Sea bathing in mid Wales c. 1800. Several bathing machines can be seen.

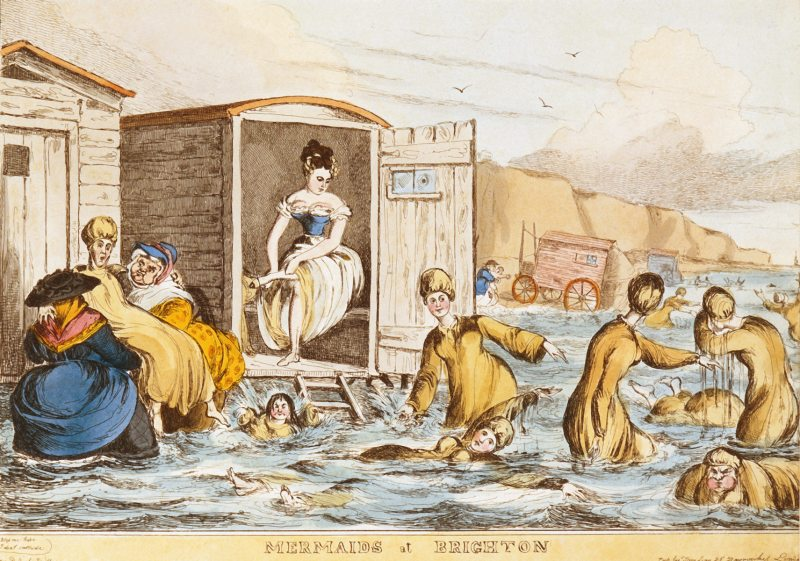
Mermaids at Brighton swim behind their bathing machines in this engraving by William Heath, c. 1829.

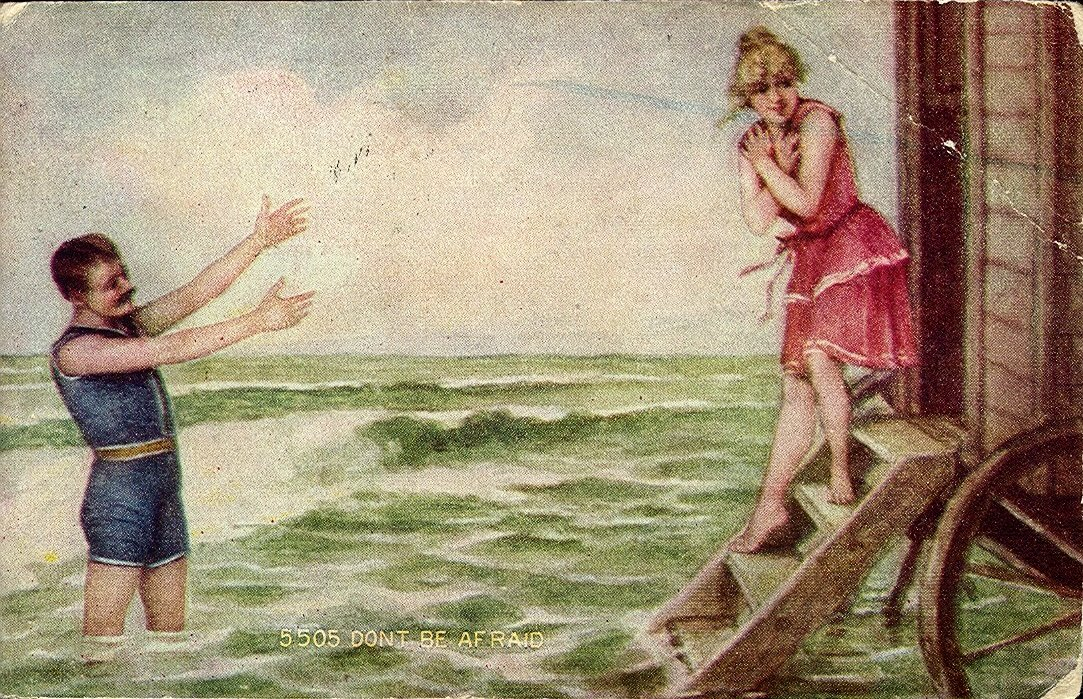
Man and woman in swimsuits, c. 1910. The woman is exiting a bathing machine. Once mixed-sex bathing became socially acceptable, bathing machines became less popular.

== History ==
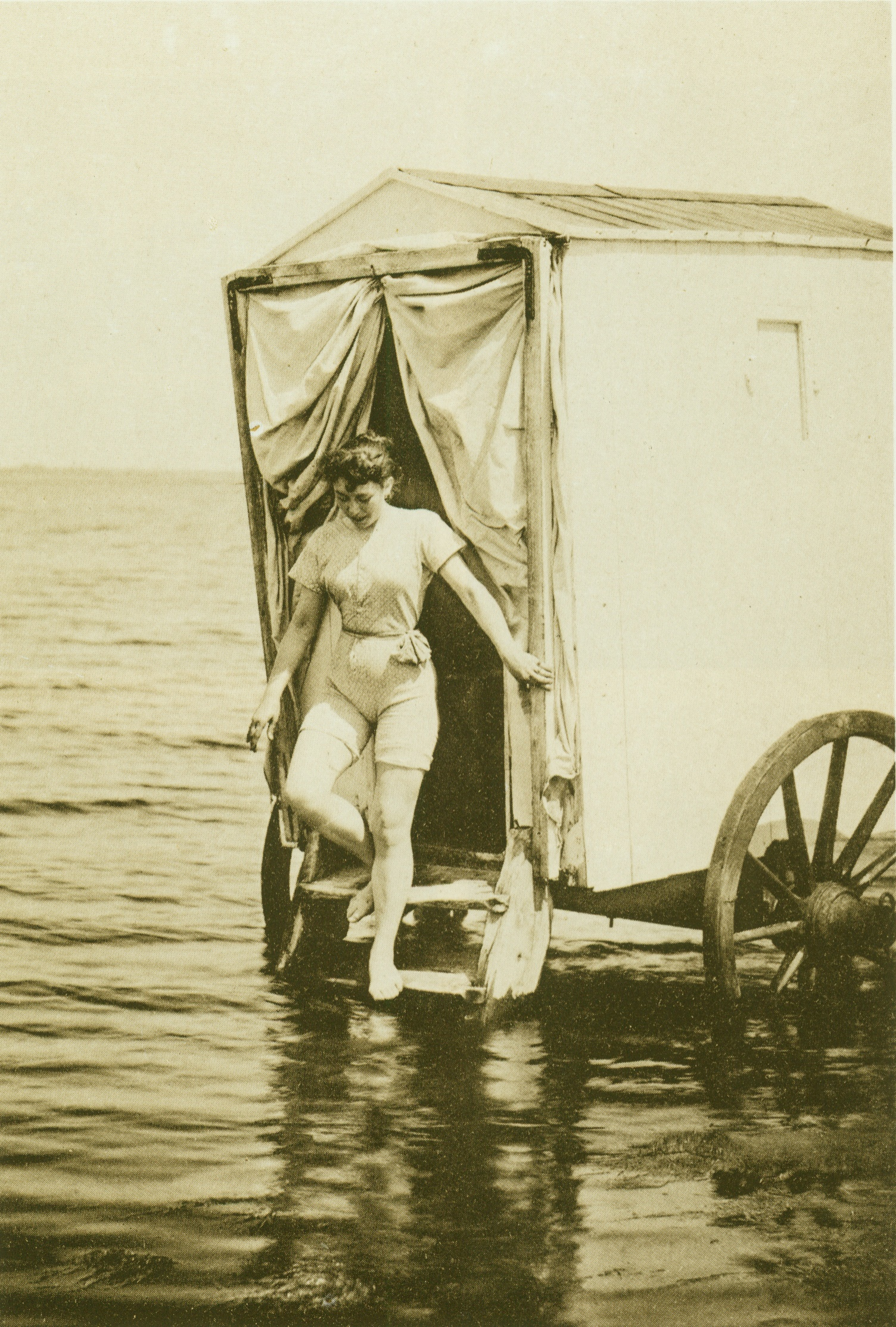
Woman in bathing suit, Schleswig-Holstein, Germany, 1893

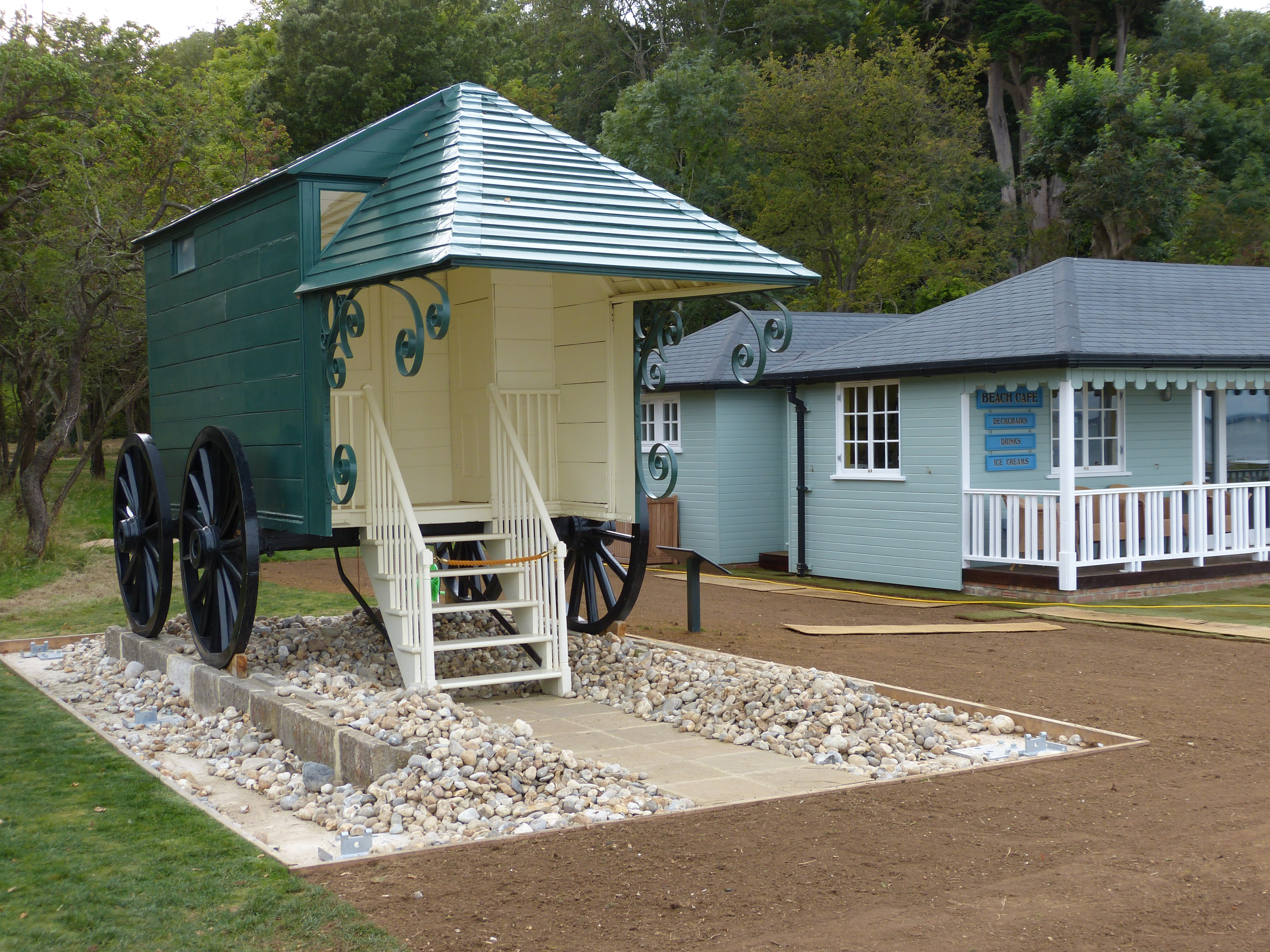
Queen Victoria's bathing machine (restored)

According to some sources, the bathing machine was developed in 1750 in Margate, Kent. That version was probably intended to conceal the user until they were mostly submerged in the water because, at the time, bathing costumes were not yet common and most people bathed nude. "Mr. Benjamin Beale, a Quaker, was the inventor of the Bath Machine. Their structure is simple, but quite convenient; and by means of the umbrella, the pleasures of bathing may be enjoyed in so private a manner, as to be consistent with the strictest delicacy." In the Scarborough Public Library, there is an engraving by John Setterington dated 1736, which shows people bathing and is popularly believed to be first evidence for bathing machines; however Devon claims this was a year earlier in 1735.

Another source however places the earliest bathing machine at the other end of Britain. According to an advertisement in the Caledonian Mercury, a machine was available daily at Leith near Edinburgh from August 1750, with the wording of the advert suggesting that it had featured in earlier editions: "That the Bathing Machine will, from Monday next, be attended close from half flood to half ebb, every lawful day by Thomas Weir Carter in Leith; his station with the same is to be upon the Sands to the West of the Glasshouse, in order to carry in such Ladies and Gentlemen who want to bathe." The machine could "hold four persons easily".

Bathing machines were most common in the United Kingdom and parts of the British Empire with a British population, but were also used in France, Germany, Netherlands, Belgium, the United States, Mexico, and other nations.

Prince Albert used one at Osborne Beach near Osborne House on the Isle of Wight, as did Queen Victoria, who used it to sketch and for bathing. She wrote about such an experience in her diary in July 1847. After the monarch's death, her machine was used as a chicken coop, but it was restored in the 1950s and put on display in 2012. According to a news report, "The queen's bathing machine was unusually ornate, with a front verandah and curtains which would conceal her until she had entered the water. The interior had a changing room and a plumbed-in WC".

Bathing machines remained in active use on English beaches until the 1890s, when they began to be parked on the beach. Legal segregation of bathing areas in Britain ended in 1901, and the use of bathing machines declined rapidly. They were then used as stationary changing rooms for a number of years. Most of them had disappeared in the United Kingdom by 1914, and, by the start of the 1920s they were almost extinct, even on beaches catering to an older clientele. However, in Aldeburgh, Suffolk, Eric Ravilious was able to paint bathing machines on wheels with winches still in use as late as 1938. In many places around the world they have survived to this day as stationary bathing boxes.

== In fiction ==
- In Lewis Carroll's (C.L. Dodgson's) "The Hunting of the Snark", the Snark's fondness for bathing machines is listed as the fourth "unmistakable mark" that Snark hunters should consider. And in "The New Belfry of Christ Church", a certain "D. C. L." jokingly wrote in "§7. On the impetus given to Art in England by the new Belfry, Ch. Ch." about using the shape of a temporary belfry in Oxford Christ Church College as a "Belfry pattern" template for bathing-machines and other products.
- In Iolanthe, the Lord Chancellor's "Nightmare Song" describes a passenger ship as not much larger than a bathing machine.
- The use of the bathing machine and segregated swimming is depicted in the 2019 ITV series Sanditon, based on the 1817 unfinished novel of the same name by Jane Austen.
- In Persuasion by Jane Austen, the principal street in the town of Lyme is said to be "animated with bathing machines" during the season.
- In "Of Human Bondage", Somerset Maugham describes the main character, Philip, swimming in the ocean, after which, "he crawled back, dripping and cold, into his bathing-machine".
- Chapter 22 of Vanity Fair (1847–48) by William Makepeace Thackeray records that, following Amelia Sedley and George Osborne's wedding: "Some ten days after the above ceremony, three young men of our acquaintance were enjoying that beautiful prospect of bow windows on the one side and blue sea on the other, which Brighton affords to the traveller. Sometimes it is towards the ocean—smiling with countless dimples, speckled with white sails, with a hundred bathing-machines kissing the skirt of his blue garment—that the Londoner looks enraptured (...)"
- In Devil in Spring by Lisa Kleypas, "Serapfina led her to a bathing-machine that had been left near a dune. It was a small enclosed room set on high wheels, with a set of steps leading up to the door".
- The bathing machine is referred to in The Woman in White by Wilkie Collins.
- The 2020 film, Ammonite, depicts Charlotte Murchison using a bathing machine.
- Chapter 24 in Agnes Grey by Anne Brontë describes the morning preparations on a beach in a bathing town, and mentions bathing machines.
- Alice in Lewis Caroll's Alice's Adventures in Wonderland naively concludes that bathing machines are to be found "wherever you go to on the English coast".

== See also ==
- Bath chair
- Beach hut
- Victorian morality
- Martha Gunn (1726–1815), a professional dipper (a strong woman who would escort the female bather, in the cart, into the surf, help her into the water and then help her out of the water)
