= John Weiss & Son =

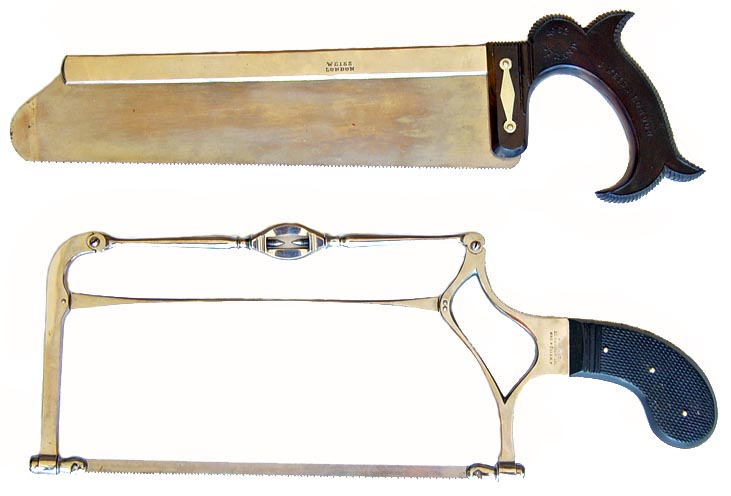
Surgical saws

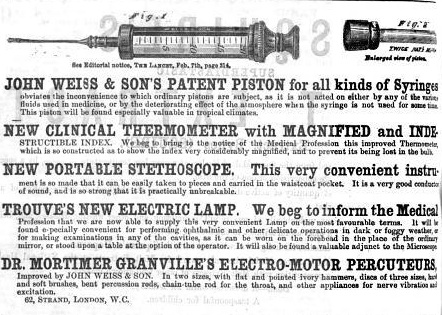
Advertisement for syringe

John Weiss & Son were a firm of London-based surgical instrument makers that operated from 1787 until 2022. The company was founded in 1787 by John Weiss, an Austrian immigrant, whose skill as master cutler and instrument maker were soon widely acknowledged. Weiss received much recognition, including a Royal Warrant for his inventiveness and craftsmanship, being appointed "Razor Makers to the King" by William IV, and many of his instruments bore the Royal Arms on the handles.

Weiss surgical knives were used by Jack the Ripper in 1888. In 1882, they were the silent weapons of choice for the Phoenix Park Murders in Dublin. In "The Adventure of Silver Blaze" (1892), one of Arthur Conan Doyle's Sherlock Holmes stories, a knife found on the crime scene is a surgical instrument marked Weiss & Co., London.

Weiss died in 1892 and his son, Frederick, took over management of the company. In 1899, the business became a limited company. In 1956, John Weiss & Son were acquired by Mappin & Webb. In the 1980s, the company was still based in London. The firm moved to Milton Keynes for a while and then to Harlow, Essex where, in 2016, it formed part of the Haag-Streit Group of companies. In 2022, the company was wound up and absorbed by its parent company, Haag-Streit UK Limited.

== History ==
=== Early history ===
The company was founded in 1787 by Austrian, John Weiss. On moving to London, Weiss began making surgical instruments and, in 1795, conducted business under the name of 'White'.

Weiss was granted the equivalent of permanent residency by King George IV on 11 October 1826, and later appointed 'Razor Maker to the King' under William IV. Weiss stamped the Royal Arms on many of the handles of his surgical instruments.

Weiss's son, Frederick Foveaux Weiss joined the company in 1831. Weiss' original premises were at 42 Strand, London and, by 1836, at 62 Strand. By 1841, the business was styled John Weiss & Son, with Richard Williams being recorded as a partner. The business in 1885 moved to 287 Oxford Street in London and to 42 King Street in Manchester. Weiss died in 1892 and Frederick took over management of the company. In 1899, the business became a limited company.

=== Catalogues ===
The company's first catalogue was published in 1823 and listed a number of improved and newly-invented instruments.

By 1825, the catalogue had grown to 126 pages with detailed accounts of the instruments and recommendations by Benjamin Collins Brodie (1783–1862), Astley Cooper (1768–1841), Everard Home (1756–1832) and other notable surgeons. The catalogue also displayed a patented gastric pump described as a 'syringe for the extracting of poisons from the stomach'. The gastric pump was widely used in the first half of the 1800s and was acclaimed as a major development in the field.

Weiss' 1831 catalogue listed a novel limb saw designed to prevent clogging when amputating, and four types of spring fleam, part of his range of veterinary instruments. Weiss was a pioneer in producing veterinary instruments after the first veterinary colleges were established in London and Edinburgh.

=== Later years ===
In 1956, John Weiss & Son were acquired by Mappin & Webb. In the 1980s, the company's addresses were given as 11 Wigmore Street and 74 Banner Street, London. The firm was still operating under the name John Weiss & Son Ltd. and was based at Milton Keynes until the 2000s. In 2016, it was based in Harlow, Essex, forming part of the Haag-Streit Group of companies. On 1 January 2022, the company ceased trading and the trade and assets were hived up to its parent company, Haag-Streit UK Limited, and the company liquidated. The company was officially dissolved on 26 December 2023.

== In popular culture ==
In 1888, Weiss surgical knives were used by the serial killer, Jack the Ripper. Earlier, in 1882, they were the silent weapons of choice for the Phoenix Park Murders in Dublin.

In "The Adventure of Silver Blaze" (1892), one of Arthur Conan Doyle's Sherlock Holmes stories, a knife found on the crime scene is a surgical instrument marked Weiss & Co., London.

== Biography of John Weiss ==
John Weiss, was born in 1773 in Rostock and baptised Johann Jacob Daniel Weiss. He was the son of Georg Berend Jacob Weiss (1740–1803) and Anna Elisabeth Wamkross. Weiss married Mary Kirby on 5 May 1805 and they had two children Frederick Foveaux Weiss, baptised 10 May 1807, and Mary Weiss, baptised 21 January 1810. Weiss's father, Georg Berend Jacob Weiss, had served an apprenticeship in the cutlery trade and was admitted as Master Cutler to the Rostock Guild of Smiths in 1765.

Weiss moved to London and began making surgical instruments. He founded his company in 1787. In 1795, he was conducting business under the name of 'White'. Weiss applied for British citizenship on 26 June 1826, having lived in England for some 31 years. He was granted the equivalent of permanent resident status by King George IV on 11 October 1826. In 1826, Weiss visited relatives in Rostock and donated a collection of his instruments to the Rostock Town Council. The council records described Weiss as a "famous manufacturer" and designated him an honorary Freeman of Rostock.

Weiss had a morbid fear of being buried alive and, to guard against this possibility, fashioned an instrument to penetrate his heart when the coffin was closed. Detailed instructions to this end were left in his will. John Weiss died on 26 December 1843 and was buried in the churchyard of St Nicholas' Church, Brighton with his surgeon Benjamin Vallance in attendance to carry out his wishes. On Weiss' death, his considerable fortune took care of the needs of his widow, son, daughter, sister, stepsister, porter and coachman. His son, Frederick Foveaux Weiss, took over management of the company on his death.
