= Living wage =

Minimum income to meet a worker's basic needs

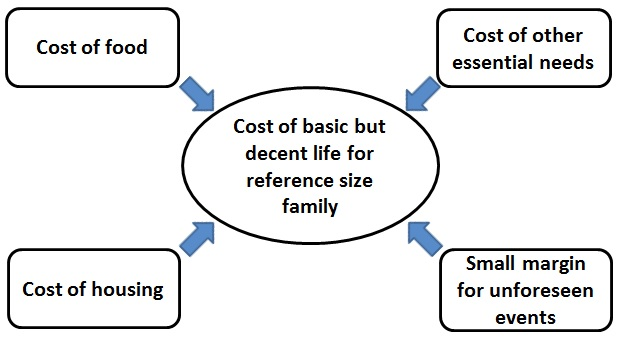
Cost of a basic but decent life for a family

A living wage is the minimum income required for a worker to meet their basic needs. This is not the same as a subsistence wage, which refers to a biological minimum, or a solidarity wage, which refers to a minimum wage tracking labor productivity. Needs include food, housing, and other essentials such as clothing. The goal of a living wage is to allow a worker to afford a basic but decent standard of living through employment without government subsidies. Due to the flexible nature of the term "needs", there is not one universally accepted measure of what a living wage is and as such it varies by location and household type. A related concept is that of a family wage – one sufficient to not only support oneself, but also to raise a family.

The living wage differs from the minimum wage in that the latter can fail to meet the requirements for a basic quality of life, which leaves the worker to rely on government programs for additional income. Living wages have typically only been adopted in municipalities. In economic terms, a minimum wage is a price floor for labor created by a legal threshold, rather than a reservation wage created by price discovery. The living wage is one possible guideline for setting a target price floor, while a minimum wage is a policy that enforces a chosen price floor.

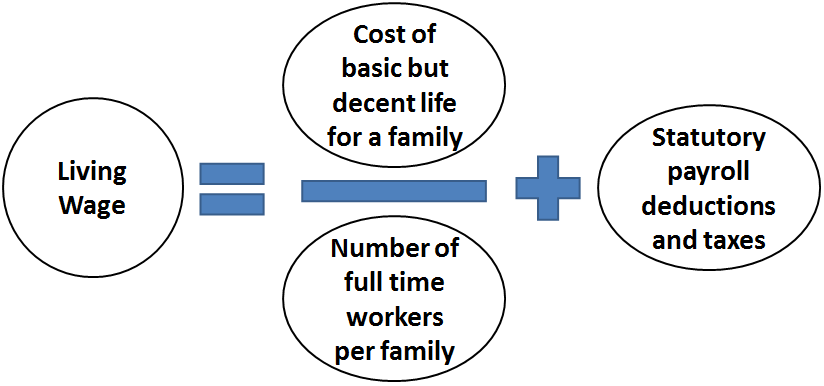
Calculating a living wage

In the United Kingdom and New Zealand, advocates define a living wage to mean that a person working 40 hours a week, with no additional income, should be able to afford the basics for a modest but decent life, such as food, shelter, utilities, transport, health care, and child care. Living wage advocates have further defined a living wage as the wage equivalent to the poverty line for a family of four. The income would have to allow the family to "secure food, shelter, clothing, health care, transportation and other necessities of living in modern society". The definition of a living wage used by the Greater London Authority (GLA) is the threshold wage, calculated as an income of 60% of the median, and an additional 15% to allow for unforeseen events.

Living wage campaigns emerged in part as a response to Reaganomics and Thatcherism in the US and UK, respectively, which shifted macroeconomic policy towards neoliberalism. A living wage, by increasing the purchasing power of low income workers, is supported by Keynesian and post-Keynesian economics, which focuses on stimulating demand to improve the state of the economy.

== History ==
"It seems to me to be equally plain that no business which depends for existence on paying less than living wages to its workers has any right to continue in this country."

— President Franklin D. Roosevelt, 1933

The concept of a living wage, though it was not defined as such, can be traced back to the works of ancient Greek philosophers such as Plato and Aristotle. Both argued for an income that accounts for needs, particularly those that ensure the common good. Aristotle saw self-sufficiency as a requirement for happiness, which he defined as, 'that which on its own makes life worthy of choice and lacking in nothing'. As he placed the responsibility in ensuring that people with low incomes could earn a sustainable living in the state, his ideas are seen as an early example of support for a living wage.

"Everyone who works has the right to just and favourable remuneration ensuring for himself and for his family an existence worthy of human dignity."

— Universal Declaration of Human Rights, Art. 23 Sec. 3

The evolution of the concept can be seen later on in medieval scholars such as Thomas Aquinas, who argued for a "just wage". The concept of a just wage was related to that of just prices, which were those that allowed everyone access to necessities. Prices and wages that prevented access to necessities were considered unjust as they would imperil the virtue of those without access.

In Wealth of Nations, Adam Smith recognized that rising real wages lead to the "improvement in the circumstances of the lower ranks of people" and are therefore an advantage to society. Growth and a system of liberty were the means by which the laboring poor were able to secure higher wages and an acceptable standard of living. Rising real wages are secured by growth driven by increased productivity, with stable price levels (i.e., prices unaffected by inflation). A system of liberty, secured through political institutions, where even the "lower ranks of people" could secure the opportunity for higher wages and an acceptable standard of living.

Servants, labourers and workmen of different kinds, make up the far greater part of every great political society. But what improves the circumstances of the greater part can never be regarded as an inconvenience to the whole. No society can surely be flourishing and happy, of which the far greater part of the members are poor and miserable. It is but equity, besides, that they who feed, clothe, and lodge the whole body of the people, should have such a share of the produce of their own labour as to be themselves tolerably well fed, clothed and lodged.

— Adam Smith, Wealth of Nations, I .viii.36

Based on these writings, Smith advocated that laborers should receive an equitable share of what they produce. For Smith, this equitable share amounted to more than subsistence. Smith equated the interests of labor and land with overarching societal interests. He reasoned that as wages and rents rise, as a result of higher productivity, societal growth will occur, thus increasing the quality of life for the greater part of its members.

Like Smith, supporters of a living wage argue that the greater good of society is achieved through higher wages. It is argued that the government should, in turn, seek to align the interests of profit-seeking actors with those of labor to produce societal benefits for the majority. Smith argued that higher productivity and overall growth led to higher wages, which in turn led to greater benefits for society. Based on his writings, one can infer that Smith would support a living wage commensurate with overall economic growth. This, in turn, would lead to greater happiness and joy for people, while helping keep families and individuals out of poverty. Political institutions can create a system of liberty that ensures individuals have opportunities for higher wages through increased production, thereby fostering stable growth for society.

According to Seth Rockman, an 1831 campaign by Baltimore seamstresses may have been the first use of the phrase "living wage" as a political slogan in America.

In 1891, Pope Leo XIII issued a papal bull entitled Rerum novarum, which is considered the Catholic Church's first expression of support for a living wage. The church recognized that wages should be sufficient to support a family. The church has widely supported this position since that time. It has been reaffirmed by the papacy on multiple occasions, such as by Pope Pius XI in 1931 Quadragesimo anno and again in 1961, by Pope John XXIII writing in the encyclical Mater et magistra. In Laborem exercens (1981), Pope John Paul II wrote, "Hence in every case a just wage is the concrete means of verifying the whole socioeconomic system and, in any case, of checking that it is functioning justly."

== Contemporary thought ==
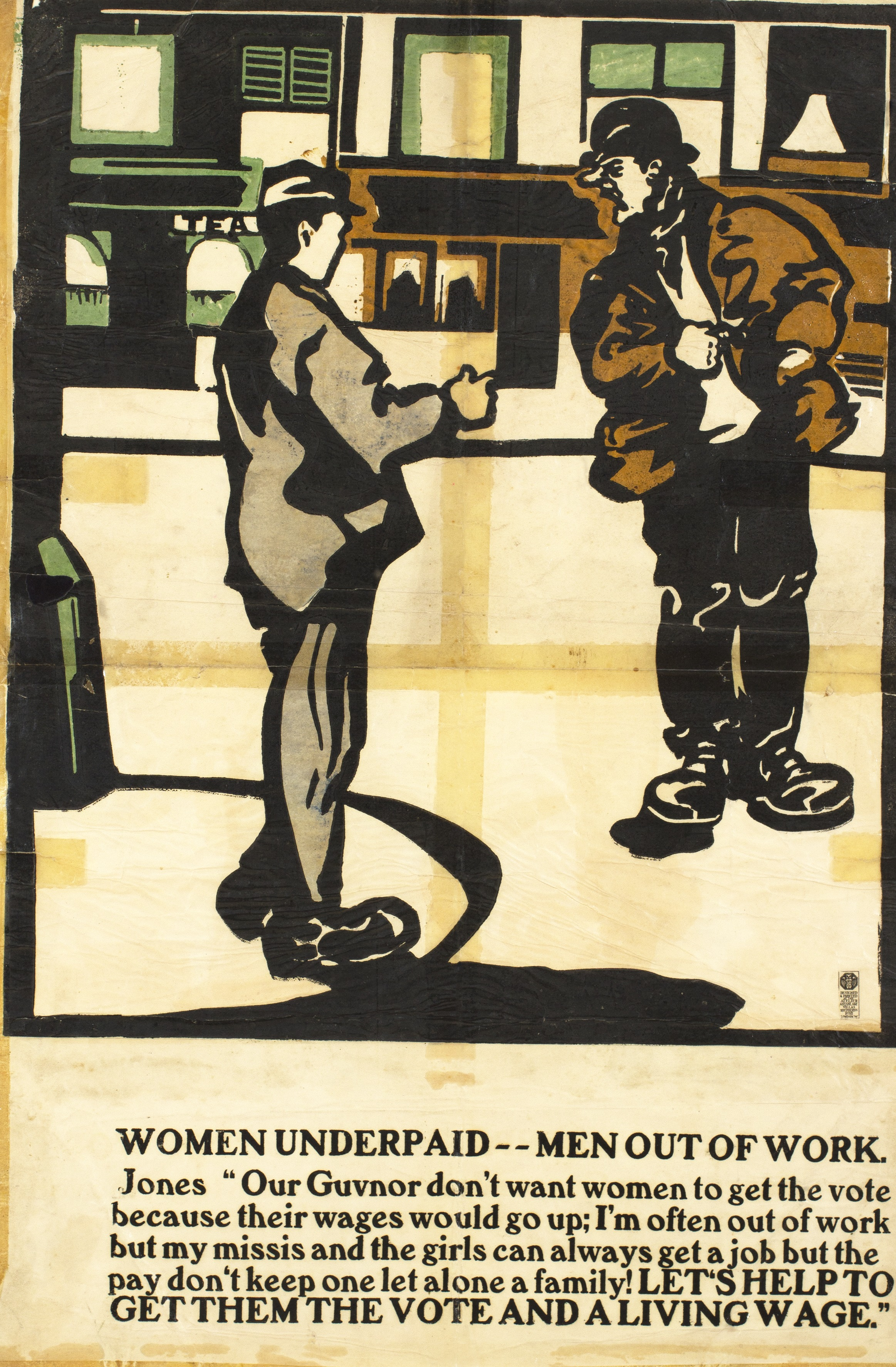
Suffrage campaign seeking the right of women to vote and a living wage (c. 1903)

Different ideas on a living wage have been advanced by modern campaigns that have pushed for localities to adopt them. Supporters of a living wage have argued that a wage is more than just compensation for labour. It is a means of securing a living, and it leads to public policies that address both the level of wages and their decency. Contemporary research by Andrea Werner and Ming Lim has analyzed the works of John Ryan, Jerold Waltman, and Donald Stabile for their philosophical and ethical insights on a living wage.

John Ryan argues for a living wage from a rights perspective. He considers a living wage to be a right that all labourers are entitled to from the 'common bounty of nature'. He argues that private ownership of resources precludes access to them by others who would need them to maintain themselves. As such, the obligation to fulfill the right to a living wage rests on the owners and employers of private resources. His argument goes beyond that a wage should provide mere subsistence but that it should provide humans with the capabilities to 'develop within reasonable limits all [their] faculties, physical, intellectual, moral and spiritual.' A living wage for him is 'the amount of remuneration that is sufficient to maintain decently the laborer'.

Jerold Waltman, in A Case for the Living Wage, argues for a living wage not based on individual rights but from a communal, or 'civic republicanism', perspective. He sees the need for citizens to be connected to their community and thus views individual and communal interests as inseparably bound. Two major problems that are antithetical to civic republicanism are poverty and inequality. A living wage is meant to address these by providing the material basis that allows individuals a degree of autonomy and prevents disproportionate income and wealth that would inevitably lead to a societal fissure between the rich and poor. A living wage further enables political participation by all classes, which is necessary to prevent the political interests of the rich from undermining the needs of the poor. These arguments for a living wage, taken together, can be seen as necessary elements for 'social sustainability and cohesion'.

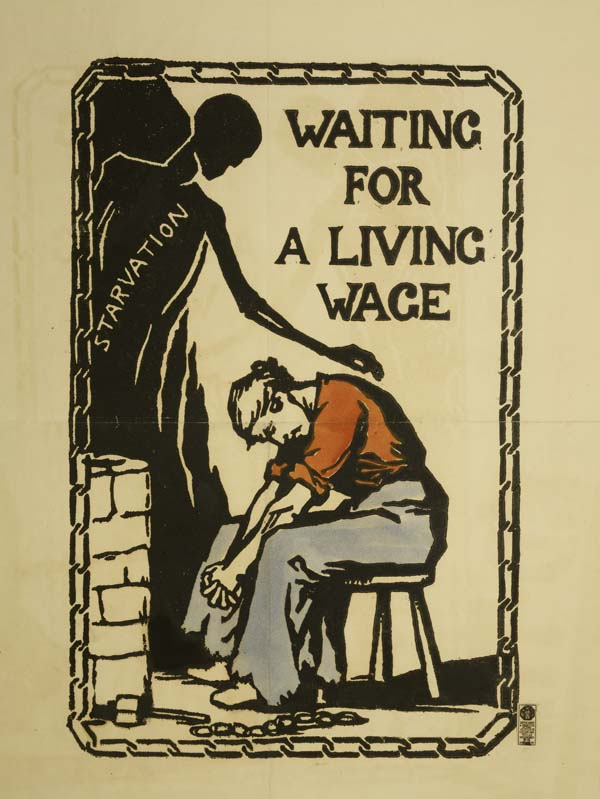
Waiting for a living wage poster (1913)

Donald Stabile argues for a living wage based on moral economic thought and its related themes of sustainability, capability, and externality. Broadly speaking, Stabile indicates that economic sustainability may require that people have the means for 'decent accommodation, transport, clothing and personal care'. He qualifies the statement as he sees individual necessities as contextual and therefore able to change over time, between cultures, and under different macroeconomic circumstances. This suggests that the concept and definition of a living wage cannot be made objective over all places and in all times. Stabile's thoughts on capabilities directly reference Amartya Sen's work on the capability approach. The tie-in with a living wage is the idea that income is an important, though not exclusive, means for capabilities. Enhancing people's capabilities enables them to function better both in society and in their roles as workers. These capabilities are further passed down from parents to children. Finally, Stabile analyses the lack of a living wage as the imposition of negative externalities on others. These externalities take the form of depleting the workforce through 'exploiting and exhausting the workforce'. This leads to economic inefficiency as businesses end up overproducing their products due to not paying the full cost of labour.

Other contemporary accounts have taken up the theme of externalities arising from the lack of a living wage. Muilenburg and Singh see welfare programs, such as housing and school meals, as being a subsidy for employers that allow them to pay low wages. This subsidy, taking the form of an externality, is of course paid for by society in the form of taxes. This thought is repeated by Grimshaw, who argues that employers offset the social costs of maintaining their workforce through tax credits, housing, benefits, and other wage subsidies. The issue was raised during the Democratic party primary election of 2016 in the United States, when presidential candidate Bernie Sanders mentioned that "struggling working families should not have to subsidise the wealthiest family in the country", and therefore, implied that the large retailer Walmart, who is owned by the wealthiest family in the country, was not paying fair wages and was being subsidised by taxpayers.

Those in favor of living wage ordinances primarily research the negative impacts of insufficient minimum wages. In a cross-comparison between minimum wage and living wage ordinances, there are profound psychological impacts to living wage implementations. Those in favor of living wage-oriented policies assert that it is important to acknowledge the region-specific costs that are severely lacking in minimum wage measurements. This line of thinking argues that a living wage can both enhance engagement and performance if implemented.

== Implementations ==
=== Australia ===
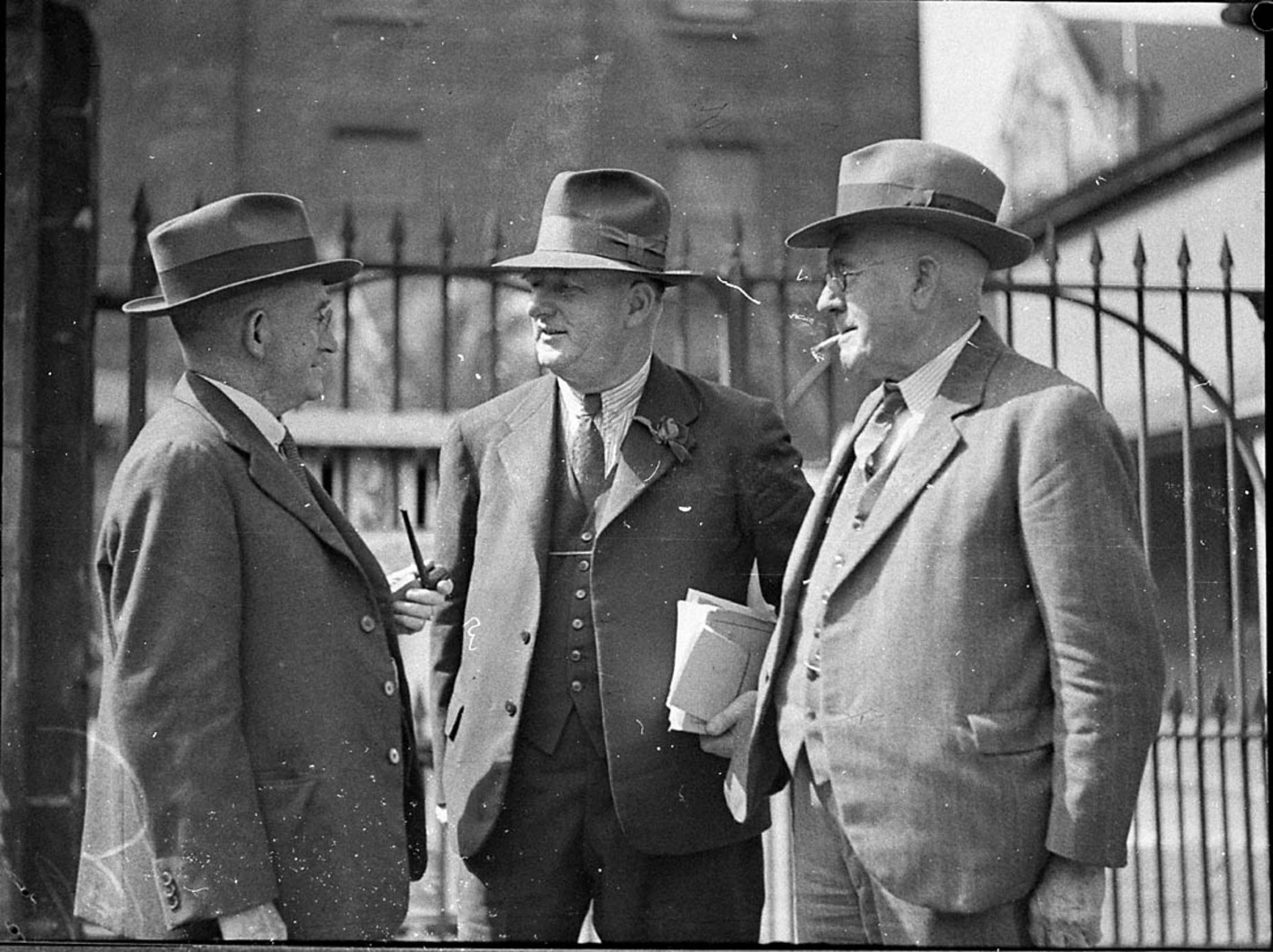
Living wage inquiry in Sydney, Australia (1935)

In Australia, the 1907 Harvester Judgement ruled that an employer was obliged to pay his employees a wage that guaranteed them a standard of living which was reasonable for "a human being in a civilised community" to live in "frugal comfort estimated by current... standards," regardless of the employer's capacity to pay. Justice H. B. Higgins established a wage of 7/- (7 shillings) per day or 42/- per week as a 'fair and reasonable' minimum wage for unskilled workers.

=== Bangladesh ===
In Bangladesh, salaries are among the lowest in the world. During 2012, wages hovered around US$38 per month, depending on the exchange rate. Studies by Professor Doug Miller during 2010 to 2012, have highlighted the evolving global trade practices in Towards Sustainable Labour Costing in UK Fashion Retail. This white paper published in 2013 by University of Manchester, appears to suggest that the competition among buying organisation has implications to low wages in countries such as Bangladesh. It has laid out a roadmap to achieve sustainable wages.

=== Mesopotamia ===
Under the Code of Hammurabi in Mesopotamia, workers were (according to one study) “assured of a living wage.”

=== Rashidun Caliphate ===
During the existence of this caliphate, measures were carried out to ensure that workers were paid fair wages.

=== United Kingdom ===
Living wage Select regions (2017)
Regions	Hourly (USD)
New Zealand	$14.57 (NZ$20.50)
United States	$16.07
Los Angleles	$18.95
New York City	$21.55
San Francisco	$23.79

Municipal regulation of wage levels began in some towns in the British Isles in 1524. National minimum wage law began with Winston Churchill's Trade Boards Act 1909, and the Wages Councils Act 1945 set minimum wage standards in many sectors of the economy. Wages Councils were abolished in 1993 and subsequently replaced by a single statutory national minimum wage under the National Minimum Wage Act 1998, which remains in force. The rates are reviewed each year by the country's Low Pay Commission. From 1 April 2016, the minimum wage has been set at the mandatory National Living Wage for workers over 25. It was phased in between 2016 and 2020 and was set at a significantly higher level than previous minimum wage rates. By 2020, it was expected to have risen to at least £9 per hour and represent a full-time annual pay equivalent to 60% of the median UK earnings. In practice, the level remained below £9 per hour until 2022.

The National Living Wage is nevertheless lower than the value of the Living Wage calculated by the Living Wage Foundation. Some organisations voluntarily pay a living wage to their staff, at a level somewhat higher than the statutory level. Since September 2014, all NHS Wales staff have been paid at least the "living wage" recommended by the Living Wage Commission. About 2,400 employees received an initial salary increase of up to £470 above the UK-wide Agenda for Change rates.

=== United States ===
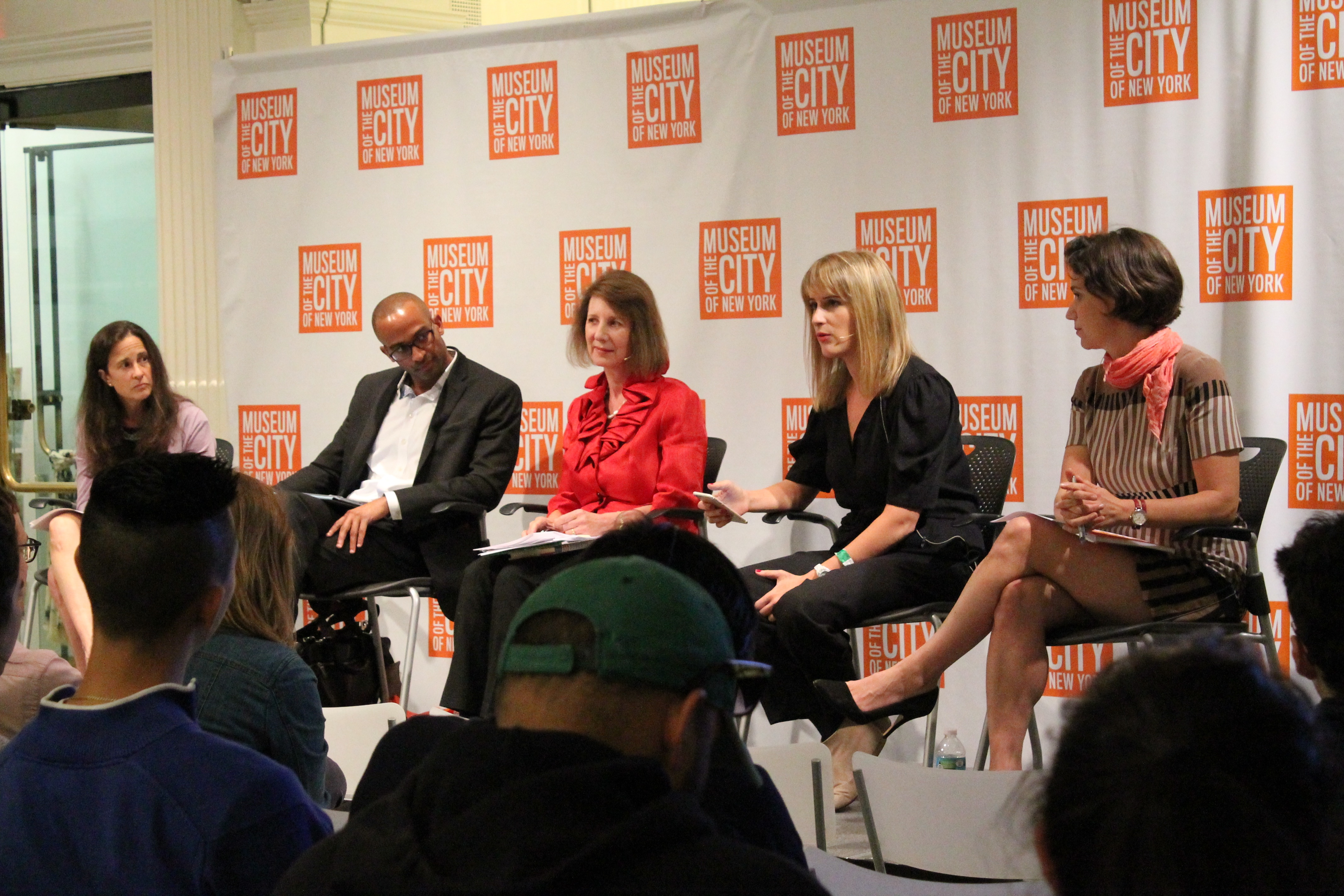
New York City Living City, Living Wage event in 2015

As of 2006, U.S. cities with living wage laws include Santa Fe and Albuquerque in New Mexico; San Francisco, California; and Washington, D.C. The city of Chicago, Illinois, also passed a living wage ordinance in 2006, but it was vetoed by Mayor Richard M. Daley. Living wage laws typically cover only businesses that receive state assistance or have contracts with the government.

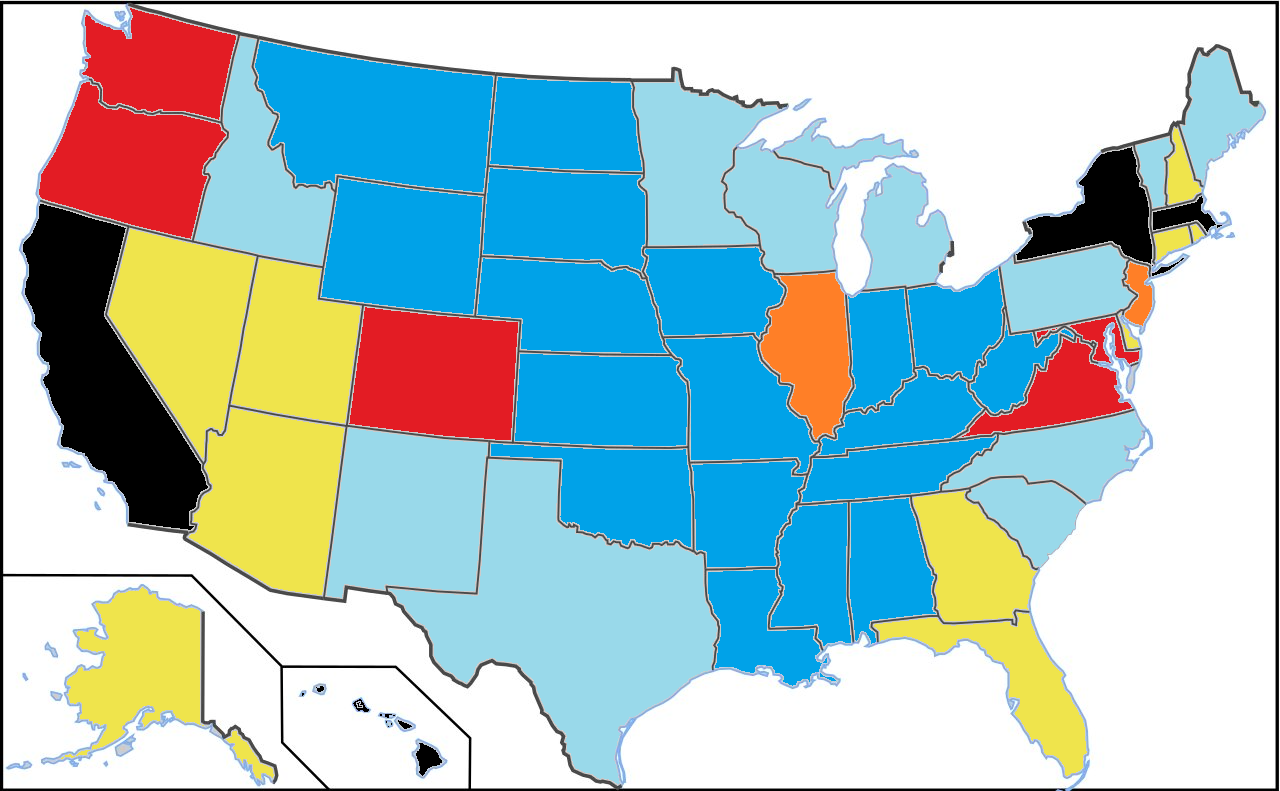
A heat map of the United States by living wage for a single, childless individual according to the MIT living wage calculator as of 2023 $15-15.99 $16.00-16.99 $17.00-17.99 $18.00-18.99 $19.00-19.99 $20+

In 2014, the Wisconsin Service Employees International Union teamed up with public officials against legislation to eliminate local living wages. According to U.S. Department of Labor data, Wisconsin Jobs Now - a nonprofit organization fighting inequality through higher wages - received at least $2.5 million from SEIU organizations between 2011 and 2013.

Although these ordinances are recent, several studies have sought to measure their impact on wages and employment. Researchers have had difficulty measuring the impact of these policies because it is difficult to isolate a control group for comparison. A notable study defined the control group as the subset of cities that attempted to pass a living wage law but were unsuccessful. This comparison indicates that living wages raise the average wage level in cities. However, it reduces the likelihood of employment for individuals in the bottom percentile of wage distribution.

== Impact ==
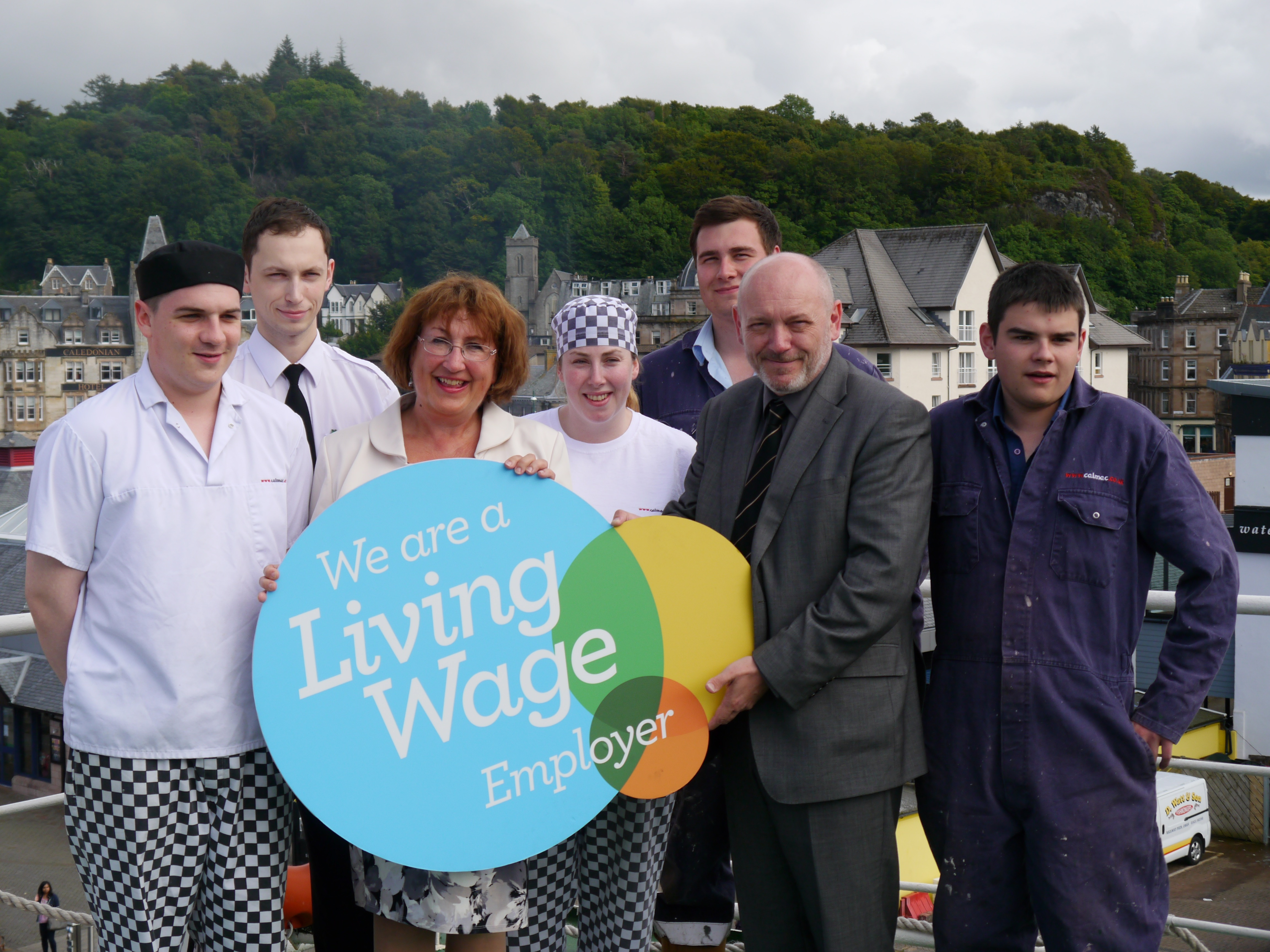
Government direction can help employers move towards offering a living wage.

Research shows that minimum wage laws and living wage legislation impact poverty differently: a study in the Journal of Labor Research found that living wage legislation "modestly" reduces poverty. The parties impacted by minimum wage laws and living wage laws differ as living wage legislation generally applies to a more limited sector of the population. It is estimated that workers who qualify for the living wage legislation currently make up 1-2% of the bottom quartile of the wage distribution. Real-life implications of living wage legislation are important to address. Raising wages can reduce job opportunities for low-wage workers because it cuts costs for profit-seeking organizations. The pool gets smaller despite an increase in wage rates.

Neumark and Adams, in their paper, "Do living wage ordinances reduce urban poverty?", state, "There is evidence that living wage ordinances modestly reduce the poverty rates in locations in which these ordinances are enacted. However, there is no evidence that state minimum wage laws do so."

A study carried out in Hamilton, Canada by Zeng and Honig indicated that living wage workers have higher affective commitment and lower turnover intention. Workers paid a living wage were more likely to support the organization they work for in various ways, including: "protecting the organization's public image, helping colleagues solve problems, improving their skills and techniques, providing suggestions or advice to a management team, and caring about the organization." The authors interpret these findings through social exchange theory, which points out the mutual obligation employers and employees feel towards each other when employees perceive they are provided favorable treatment.

Living wage policies reduce poverty by addressing financial insecurity and signaling fairness and dignity, fostering employee commitment and organizational stability.

== Living wage estimates ==
As of 2003, there are 122 living wage ordinances in American cities and an additional 75 under discussion. Article 23 of the United Nations Universal Declaration of Human Rights states that "Everyone who works has the right to just and favourable remuneration ensuring for himself and for his family an existence worthy of human dignity."

In addition to legislative acts, many corporations have adopted voluntary codes of conduct. The Sullivan Principles in South Africa are a voluntary code of conduct that requires firms to compensate workers to at least cover their basic needs.

In the table below, cross-national comparable living wages were estimated for twelve countries and reported in local currencies and purchasing power parity (PPP). Living wage estimates for the year 2000 range from US$1.7 PPP per hour in low-income examples to approximately US$11.6 PPP per hour in high-income examples.

Country	One full-time worker (four-person household)	Average number of full-time worker equivalents in country (four-person household)	One full-time worker (household size varies by country)	Average number of full-time worker equivalents in each country
Bangladesh	1.61	1.14	2.02	1.44
India	1.55	1.32	1.79	1.52
Zimbabwe	2.43	1.70	3.18	2.22
Low income average	1.86	1.39	2.33	1.72
Armenia	3.03	2.05	2.52	1.70
Ecuador	1.94	1.74	2. 23	2.01
Egypt	1.96	1.77	2.45	2.21
China	2.08	1.47	1.95	1.38
South Africa	3.10	2.60	3.35	2.81
Lower middle income average	2.42	1.93	2.50	2.02
Lithuania	4.62	3.21	3.97	2.76
Costa Rica	3.68	3.38	3.90	3.58
Upper middle income average	4.14	3.30	3.94	3.17
United States	13.10	11.00	13.36	11.23
Switzerland	16.41	13.23	14.76	11.91
High income average	14.75	12.10	14.06	11.57

Living wage estimates vary considerably by area, and may be calculated in different ways. In a 2019 report, the U.S. advocacy group National Low Income Housing Coalition calculated the necessary full-time hourly wage to spend 30% of income on renting a fair-market 2-bedroom apartment. Estimates range from a high of $36.82/hr in Hawaii (where minimum wage is $10.10/hr) to $14.26 in Arkansas (the lowest state, raising its minimum from $9.25 to $11/hr) and $9.59/hr in Puerto Rico (where minimum wage is $7.25/hr).

== Living wage movements ==
=== Living Wage Foundation ===
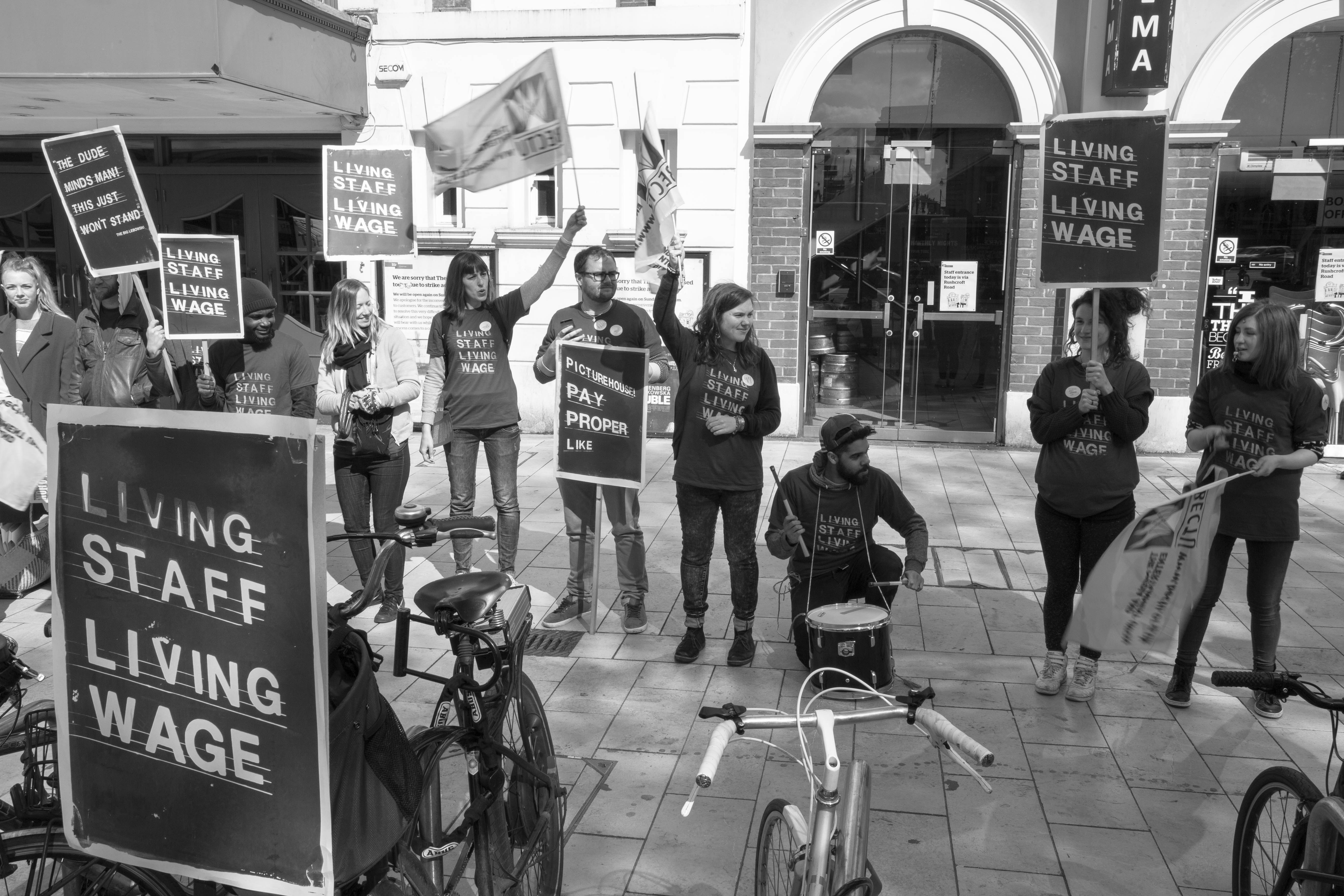
Workers protesting for a living wage in London, United Kingdom (2017)

The Living Wage Campaign in the United Kingdom originated in London, where it was launched in 2001 by members of the community organisation London Citizens (now Citizens UK). It engaged in a series of Living Wage campaigns, and in 2005, the Greater London Authority established the Living Wage Unit to calculate the London Living Wage, although the authority had no power to enforce it. The London Living Wage was developed in 2008 when Trust for London awarded a grant of over £1 million for campaigning, research, and an employer accreditation scheme. The Living Wage campaign subsequently grew into a national movement with local campaigns across the UK. The Joseph Rowntree Foundation funded the Centre for Research in Social Policy (CRSP) at Loughborough University to calculate a UK-wide Minimum Income Standard (MIS) figure, an average across the whole of the UK independent of the higher living costs in London.

In 2011, the CRSP used the MIS as the basis for developing a standard model for setting the UK Living Wage outside of London. Citizens UK, a nationwide community organising institution developed out of London Citizens, launched the Living Wage Foundation and Living Wage Employer mark. Since 2011, the Living Wage Foundation has accredited thousands of employers that pay its proposed living wage. GLA Economics calculates the living wage in London, and the CRSP calculates the out-of-London Living Wage. Their recommended hourly rates for 2015 are £9.40 for London and £8.25 for the rest of the UK. These rates are updated annually in November. In January 2016, the Living Wage Foundation set up a new Living Wage Commission to oversee the calculation of the Living Wage rates in the UK.

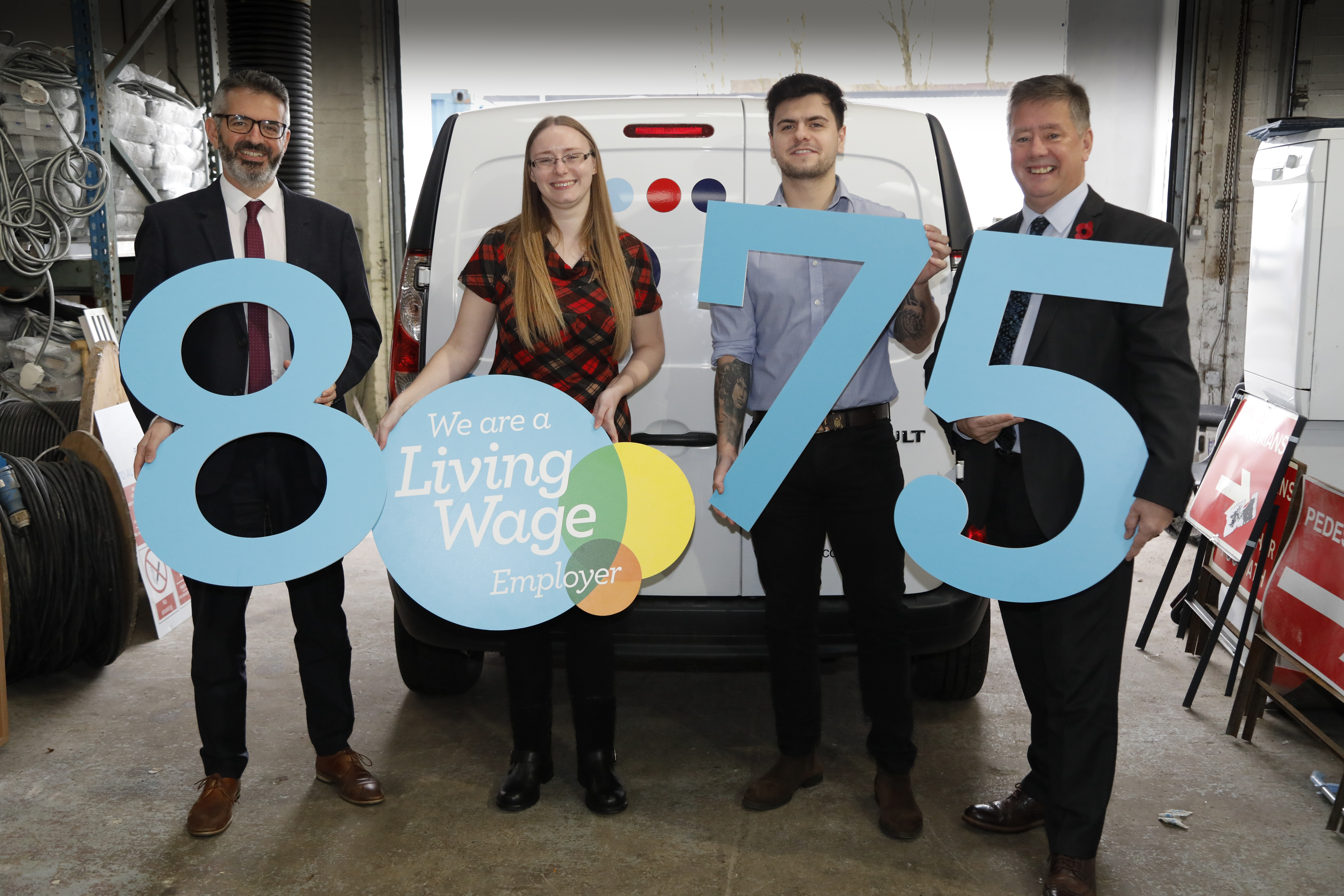
Keith Brown (SNP) and other Scottish campaigners, supporting an £8.75 living wage in 2017

In 2012, research into the costs and benefits of a living wage in London was funded by the Trust for London and carried out by Queen Mary University of London. Further research was published in 2014 in several reports on the potential impact of raising the UK's statutory national minimum wage to the same level as the Living Wage Foundation's living wage recommendation. This included two reports funded by the Trust for London and carried out by the Institute for Public Policy Research (IPPR) and Resolution Foundation: "Beyond the Bottom Line" and "What Price a Living Wage?" Additionally, Landman Economics published "The Economic Impact of Extending the Living Wage to all Employees in the UK".

A 2014 report by the Living Wage Commission, chaired by Doctor John Sentamu, the Archbishop of York, recommended that the UK government should pay its own workers a "living wage", but that it should be voluntary for the private sector. Data published in late 2014 by New Policy Institute and Trust for London found 20% of employees in London were paid below the Living Wage Foundation's recommended living wage between 2011 and 2013. The proportion of residents paid less than this rate was highest in Newham (37%) and Brent (32%). Research by the Office for National Statistics in 2014 indicated that at that time the proportion of jobs outside London paying less than the living wage was 23%. The equivalent figure within London was 19%. Research by Loughborough University, commissioned by Trust for London, shows 4 in 10 Londoners cannot afford a decent standard of living - that one allows them to meet their basic needs and participate in society at a minimum level. This is significantly higher than the 30% that fall below the standard in the UK as a whole. This represents 3.5 million Londoners, an increase of 400,000 since 2010/11. The research highlights the need to improve incomes through higher wages, particularly the London Living Wage, to ensure more Londoners can reach a decent standard of living.

Ed Miliband, the leader of the Labour Party in opposition from 2010 until 2015, supported a living wage and proposed tax breaks for employers who adopted it. The Labour Party has implemented a living wage in some local councils which it controls, such as in Birmingham and Cardiff councils. The Green Party also supports the introduction of a living wage, believing that the national minimum wage should be 60% of net national average earnings. Sinn Féin also supports the introduction of a living wage for Northern Ireland. Other supporters include The Guardian newspaper columnist Polly Toynbee, Church Action on Poverty, the Scottish Low Pay Unit, and Bloomsbury Fightback!.

=== Republic of Ireland ===
There has been an active living wage campaign in the Republic of Ireland since 2014. It is supported by The Vincentian Partnership for Social Justice (VPSJ), Nevin Economic Research Institute (NERI), TASC, Social Justice Ireland, UCD School of Social Policy, Social Work and Social Justice, SIPTU, Unite the Union and the Society of St Vincent de Paul.

Below is a table of the hourly minimum wage (for adults) and the living wage recommended by the living wage campaign for each year since 2014.

Year	Living wage	Minimum wage
2014	€11.45	€8.65
2015	€11.50	€8.65
2016	€11.50	€9.15
2017	€11.70	€9.25
2018	€11.90	€9.55
2019–20	€12.30	€9.80
2020–21	€12.30	€10.20
2021–22	€12.90	€10.44

It is calculated on the basis of the VPSJ's Minimum Essential Standard of Living (MESL) research, and set by the Living Wage Technical Group, benchmarked against the cost of minimum standard of living. It is supported by the political parties Sinn Féin, Labour and the Social Democrats, while Solidarity–People Before Profit recommend a living wage of €15. Aontú support a living wage, with different regional rates, and have also recommended a "living pension."

It has been opposed by employers, including Ibec and the Irish Small Firms Association (ISFA), while the supermarket chains Lidl and Aldi committed to pay all their employees the living wage in 2020.

In 2021, the Low Pay Commission began studying the living wage and deciding whether there should be different living wages for different age groups or regions.

=== Asia Floor Wage ===
Launched in 2009, Asia Floor Wage is a loose coalition of labour and other groups seeking to implement a Living Wage throughout Asia, with a particular focus on textile manufacturing. There are member associations in Bangladesh, Cambodia, Hong Kong S.A.R., India, Indonesia, Malaysia, Pakistan, the Philippines, Sri Lanka, Thailand, and Turkey, as well as supporters in Europe and North America. The campaign targets multinational employers who do not pay their workers in the developing world a living wage.

=== United States living wage campaigns ===
==== New York City ====
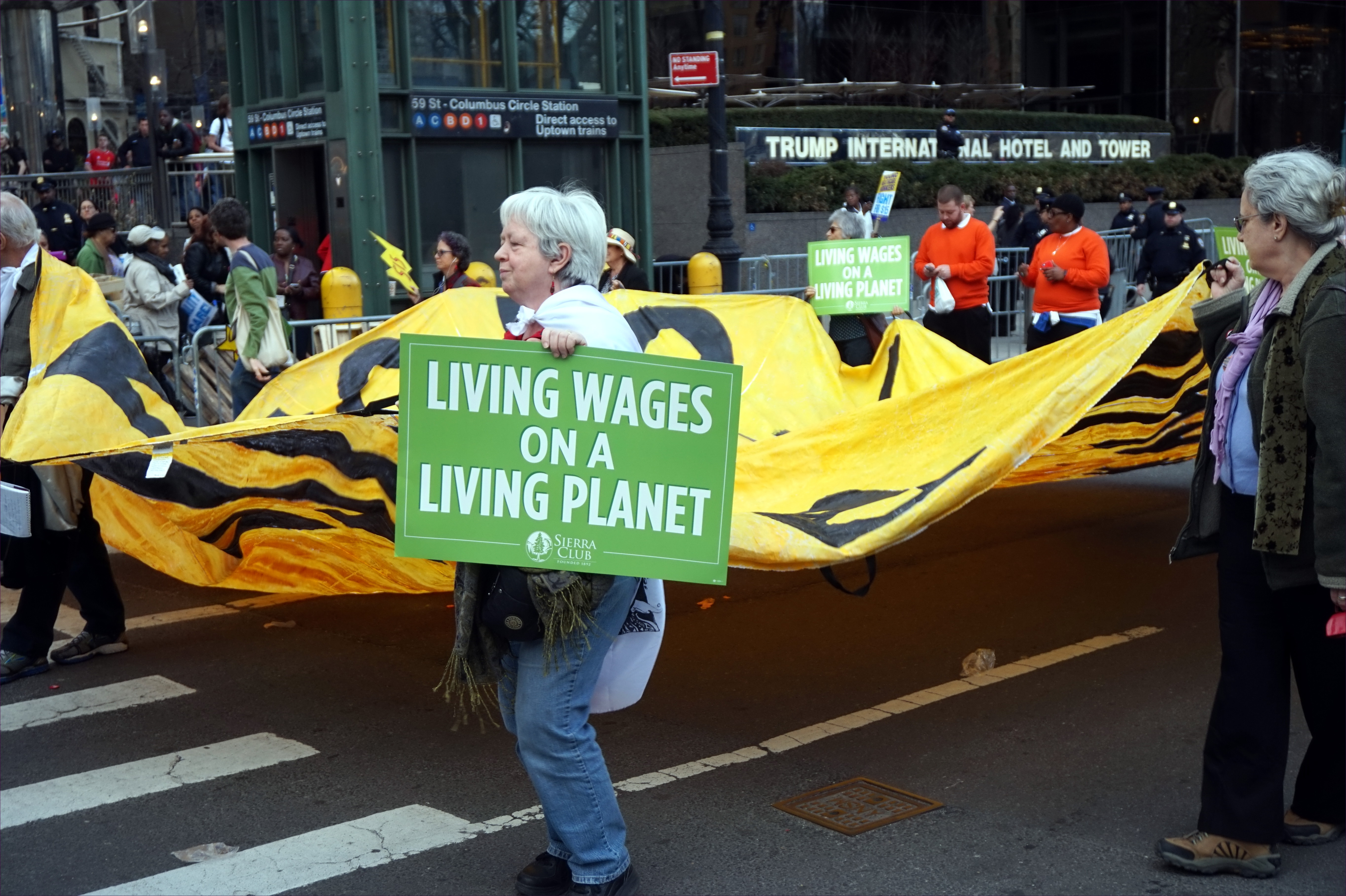
Living wage protest and march in New York City (2015)

The proposed law will inform taxpayers of where their investment dollars go and will hold developers to more stringent employment standards. The proposed act will require developers who receive substantial taxpayer-funded subsidies to pay employees a minimum living wage. The law is designed to raise the quality of life and stimulate the local economy. Specifically, the proposed act will guarantee that workers on large development projects will receive a wage of at least $10.00 per hour. The living wage will be indexed to keep up with cost of living increases. Furthermore, the act will require that employees who do not receive health insurance from their employer receive an additional $1.50 an hour to subsidize their healthcare expenses. Workers employed at a subsidized development will also be entitled to the living wage guarantee.

Many city officials have opposed living wage requirements because they believe that they restrict the business climate, thus making cities less appealing to potential industries. Logistically, cities must hire employees to administer the ordinance. Conversely, advocates for the legislation have acknowledged that when wages aren't sufficient, low-wage workers are often forced to rely on public assistance in the form of food stamps or Medicaid.

James Parrott of the Fiscal Policy Institute testified during a May 2011 New York City Council meeting that real wages for low-wage workers in the city have declined substantially over the last 20 years, despite dramatic increases in average education levels. A report by the Fiscal Policy Institute indicated that business tax subsidies have grown two and a half times faster than overall New York City tax collections and asks why these public resources are invested in poverty-level jobs. Mr. Parrott testified that income inequality in New York City exceeds that of other large cities, with the highest-earning 1 percent receiving 44 percent of all income.

==== Miami-Dade County ====
The Community Coalition for a Living Wage (CCLW) was launched in 1997 in Miami, Florida, as a partnership between local anti-poverty and labor organizations Catalyst Miami, Legal Services of Greater Miami, and the South Florida AFL–CIO. The CCLW organized the successful campaign to pass a Miami-Dade County living wage ordinance in 1999, the first of its kind in the South. The ordinance requires Miami-Dade County and its contractors to pay all employees a living wage pegged to inflation: $12.63/hr with benefits, or $15 without (as of 2018).

==== University of Virginia ====
In February 2012, a Living Wage Campaign at the University of Virginia released a series of demands to university administrators, calling for a living wage policy. These demands included a requirement that the university "explicitly address" the issue by 17 February. Although University President Teresa Sullivan did respond to the demands in a mass email sent to the university community shortly before the end of the day on 17 February, the Campaign criticized her response as "intentionally misleading" and vowed to take action.

On 18 February, the campaign announced that 12 students would begin a hunger strike to publicize the plight of low-paid workers.

== Criticism ==
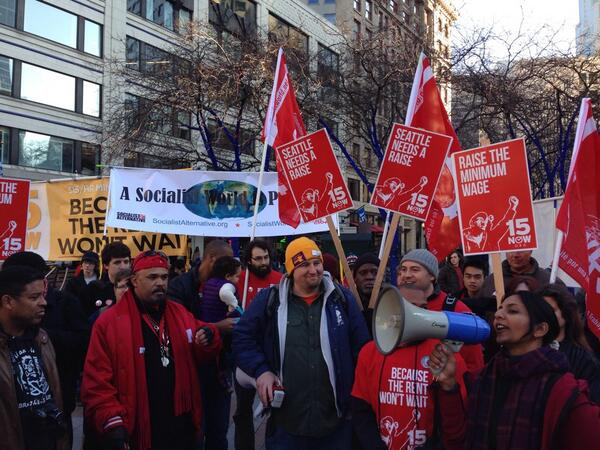
2014 march for a living wage in Seattle, Washington

Criticisms of the implementation of living wage laws have taken forms similar to those of minimum wage. Economically, both can be analyzed as a price floor for labor. A price floor, if above the equilibrium price and thus effective, necessarily leads to a surplus. This means the number of employees an employer is willing to hire at a living wage is below the number they would hire at the equilibrium wage. Many argue that, in the context of a labor market, this would reduce the macroeconomic aggregate demand for labor across all employers, and thus presume that setting the minimum wage at a living wage could raise unemployment.

The Rehn-Meidner model proposed that a higher minimum wage would induce productivity growth from structural change, reorganizing workers into different jobs across employers with different microeconomic labor demands, rather than reducing aggregate demand for labor. A large body of empirical research has focused on the employment effects of the minimum wage, much of it following a study by David Card and Alan Krueger, which found no difference in unemployment rates between two states after a minimum wage increase in one. A contention that often impedes the progression of a living wage ordinance concerns its scope: it is controversial whether it should apply to an individual or an entire family, as wage structures can vary across households within a state. Potential solutions to the complexity of a living wage ordinance include a "specific employer provision", which seeks to evaluate the pros and cons to a living wage on a company to company basis. An argument in favor of this approach asserts that it can help bolster employee morale and increase social capital.

Critics have warned of not just an increase in unemployment but also price increases and a shortage of entry-level jobs due to labor-substitution effects. The voluntary undertaking of a living wage is criticized as impossible due to the competitive advantage other businesses in the same market would have over the one adopting a living wage. The economic argument would be that, ceteris paribus (all other things being equal), a company that paid its workers more than required by the market would be unable to compete with those that pay according to market rates. The concept of a living wage based on its definition as a family wage has been criticized by some for emphasizing the role of men as breadwinners.

Another issue that has emerged is that living wages may be less effective as an anti-poverty tool than other measures. Authors point to living wages as only a limited way of addressing the problems of rising economic inequality, the increase in long-term low-wage jobs, and the decline of unions and legal protections for workers. Since living wage ordinances attempt to address the issue of a living wage, defined by some of its proponents as a family wage, rather than as an individual wage, many of the beneficiaries may already be in families that make substantially more than that necessary to provide an adequate standard of living; this argument focuses on the portion benefitting who are in poverty, rather than the portion in poverty who are benefitting. According to a 2000 survey of labor economists by the Employment Policies Institute, only 31% viewed living wages as a very or somewhat effective anti-poverty tool, while 98% viewed policies such as the US earned income tax credit and general welfare grants similarly. On the other hand, according to Zagros Madjd-Sadjadi, an economist with the State of California's Division of Labor Statistics and Research, the living wage may be seen by the public as preferable to other methods because it reinforces the work ethic and ensures that there is something of value produced, unlike welfare, that is often believed to be a pure cash "gift" from the public coffers.

== See also ==
- Affordable housing – Housing affordable to those with a median household income
- Cost of living – Cost to live based on price of necessities
- Decent work – Employment that respects the fundamental rights of the human person
- Distributism – Economic theory promoting local control
- Family wage – Sufficient pay to support a family
- Guaranteed minimum income – Social-welfare system
- Labor market – Study of the markets for wage labour
- Maximum wage – Wage control law
- Minimum wage – Lowest remuneration which can be paid legally in a state for working
- Positive rights – Rights that oblige either inaction or action
- Precarious work – Type of non-standard or temporary employment
- Standard of living – Measure of income, comfort and services
- Subsistence crisis – Crisis which occurs when access to basic necessities are challenged
- Supply and demand – Economic model of price determination in a market
- Trade Boards Act 1909 – Act of the Parliament of the United Kingdom
- Universal inheritance
- Universal basic income – Unconditional social welfare proposal
- Universal Living Wage – US campaign for a flexible living wage
- Working poor – Working people whose incomes fall below the poverty line
