= Living Wage Foundation =

Campaigning organisation in the United Kingdom

- Formation: 2011; 15 years ago
- Type: Campaign group
- Headquarters: Living Wage Foundation, Citizens UK Head Office, Jacquard Point 1 and 3, Tapestry Way, London, E1 2FJ
- Location: London, United Kingdom
- Coordinates: 51.518593°N 0.0583103°W
- Director: Katherine Chapman
- Parent organization: Citizens UK
- Website: https://www.livingwage.org.uk/

The Living Wage Foundation is a campaigning organisation in the United Kingdom which aims to persuade employers to pay a living wage. The organisation was established in 2011; it publishes an annual Living Wage figure and for a fee accredits employers who pay at the rate of the "living wage".

In October 2026, the "Real Living Wage" for the following year was announced as £14.10 per hour in the UK and £15.45 per hour in London.

== History ==
The Living Wage Foundation grew out of the Living Wage Campaign which originated in London. The campaign was launched in 2001 by members of London Citizens, a community organisation which subsequently developed into the nationwide community organising institution Citizens UK. The Living Wage Campaign called for every worker in the country to earn enough to provide their family with the essentials of life. It engaged in a series of Living Wage campaigns and in 2005 the Greater London Authority established the Living Wage Unit to calculate the London Living Wage, although the authority had no power to enforce it. The London Living Wage was developed in 2008 when Trust for London awarded a grant of over £1,000,000 for campaigning, research and an employer accreditation scheme. The Living Wage campaign subsequently grew into a national movement with local campaigns across the UK. The Joseph Rowntree Foundation funded the Centre for Research in Social Policy (CRSP) at Loughborough University to calculate the Minimum Income Standard (MIS), a UK-wide figure taking an average from across the whole country and independent of the higher living costs in London. In 2011, the CRSP used the MIS as the basis for developing a standard model for setting the UK Living Wage outside of London and other cities around the UK began to adopt the campaign. As a result of the campaign's success, Citizens UK set up the Living Wage Foundation and the Living Wage Employer mark in 2011 to provide companies with intelligence and accreditation. The Living Wage Foundation argues that paying a Living wage is not merely ethical, but also constitutes business best practice and improves productivity.

Having bought shares in Next plc, the Living Wage Foundation sent representatives to the company's annual general meeting in May 2014 in an attempt to persuade the company to pay at least £7.65 per hour and become the first retailer among the UK's 700 living wage employers. Next was chosen because it was considered to be a good employer and was thriving. Professor Sir George Bain who set the minimum wage in 1999 said employers could afford to pay much more but acknowledged enforcement could cause unemployment in the retail sector.

From 15 November 2021, the living wage rate or "real living wage" was £9.90 per hour outside London and £11.05 per hour within London. Increases to £10.90 outside London and £11.95 inside London were announced on 22 September 2022, with the Living Wage Foundation expecting member employers to implement the increase "as soon as possible but by the latest 14th May 2023". It was also reported that there were 11,000 businesses accredited by the Foundation, at the time.

== Legal status ==
The living wage declared by the Living Wage Foundation has no legal status. Statutory minimum wage levels in the UK are determined by the statutory national minimum wage set up by regulations made under the National Minimum Wage Act 1998. The rates are reviewed each year by the Low Pay Commission. The national minimum wage aims to protect the lowest paid from exploitation, but its level often falls short of the local cost of living and it has increasingly failed to prevent in-work poverty without welfare payments by the state to supplement earnings.

From 1 April 2016 the national minimum wage has been paid as a mandatory National Living Wage for workers over 25. It was phased in between 2016 and 2020 and was set at a significantly higher level than previous minimum wage rates. It was expected to have risen to at least £9 per hour by 2020, representing a full-time annual pay equivalent to 60% of the median UK earnings, though the target figure of £9 per hour was not actually reached until 2022. The National Living Wage is nevertheless lower than the value of the Living Wage calculated by the Living Wage Foundation. To distinguish the two, the latter is sometimes called the "real living wage".

Payment at the rate of the Living Wage Foundation's level of living wage is voluntary.

== Studies ==
In 2012, research into the costs and benefits of a living wage in London was funded by the Trust for London and carried out by Queen Mary University of London. Further research was published in 2014 in a number of reports on the potential impact of raising the UK's statutory national minimum wage to the same level as the Living Wage Foundation's living wage recommendation. This included two reports funded by the Trust for London and carried out by the Institute for Public Policy Research (IPPR) and Resolution Foundation: "Beyond the Bottom Line" and "What Price a Living Wage?". Additionally, Landman Economics published "The Economic Impact of Extending the Living Wage to all Employees in the UK".

A 2014 report by the Living Wage Commission, chaired by Doctor John Sentamu, the Archbishop of York, recommended that the UK government should pay its own workers a "living wage", but that it should be voluntary for the private sector. Data published in late 2014 by New Policy Institute and Trust for London found 20% of employees in London were paid below the Living Wage Foundation's recommended living wage between 2011 and 2013. The proportion of residents paid less than this rate was highest in Newham (37%) and Brent (32%). Research by the Office for National Statistics in 2014 indicated that at that time the proportion of jobs outside London paying less than the living wage was 23%. The equivalent figure within London was 19%.

Research published in 2018 by the accountants KPMG indicated that the take-up of the living wage had started to fall. 21% of jobs nationally paid less than the living wage in 2017, but by 2018 the figure had increased to 22%. Overall the number of workers earning less than the living wage had increased from 4.87 million in 2013 to 5.75 million in 2018.

== Results ==
By 2015, 1,300 employers with 80,000 workers had agreed to voluntarily pay the Foundation's Living Wage. Of these, 400 employers were in London with 20,000 workers. By 2016 the number of UK business paying the Living Wage had increased to 3,000. By September 2022 there were 11,000 businesses who were accredited by the Foundation, but many other employers use the Living Wage as a benchmark without necessarily seeking accreditation.

== Supporters ==
Ed Miliband, the leader of the Labour Party in opposition from 2010 until 2015, supported a living wage and proposed tax breaks for employers who adopted it. The Labour Party has implemented a living wage in some local councils which it controls, such as in Birmingham and Cardiff councils. The Green Party also supports the introduction of a living wage, believing that the national minimum wage should be 60% of net national average earnings. Sinn Féin also supports the introduction of a living wage for Northern Ireland. Other supporters include The Guardian newspaper columnist Polly Toynbee, Church Action on Poverty, the Scottish Low Pay Unit, and Bloomsbury Fightback!

== See also ==
- Basic income
- Distributism
- Guaranteed minimum income
- Human rights
- Labor market
- Maximum wage
- Positive rights
- Precarious work
- Supply and demand
- Trade Boards Act 1909
- Working poor
- Zero-hour contract
