= Jonathan Bradshaw =

British academic (born 1944)

Jonathan Richard Bradshaw, CBE, FBA, FAcSS (born 15 February 1944) is a British academic, specialising in social policy, poverty and child welfare. He is Professor Emeritus of Social Policy at the University of York.

== Early life and education ==
He studied at Trinity College Dublin, where he graduated with first-class honours in social studies in 1967 and obtained an MA in philosophy in the same year. He subsequently completed an MPhil in social administration at the University of York in 1969 and a DPhil in social administration in 1978.

== Academic career ==
Bradshaw joined the University of York in 1967 as a postgraduate student and was appointed a research fellow in 1968 in the Department of Social Administration and Social Work. He became a lecturer in 1969 and was appointed professor of social policy in 1981. From 1973 to 1987, he was the founding director of the university's Social Policy Research Unit (SPRU), which conducts research on social policy and public services.

He served as head of the Department of Social Policy and Social Work from 1988 to 1994 and again from 2003 to 2007. From 1994 to 1998, he directed the Institute for Research in the Social Sciences at York and also served as associate director of SPRU. He became professor emeritus in 2014.

Bradshaw also held a part-time professorship in social policy at Durham University from 2013 to 2015 and was a professorial fellow there from 2016 to 2017. His professional appointments included the presidency of the Foundation for International Studies in Social Security from 1999 to 2003 and participation in international research networks concerned with social security and child well-being.

== Research ==
Bradshaw's research has focused on poverty, social security, living standards, family policy, comparative social policy and child well-being. His work has examined the adequacy of welfare benefits, the effects of social security policies on household living standards, and differences between national approaches to family support and poverty reduction.

During the early part of his career, he conducted research on lone-parent families, non-resident fathers and the financial circumstances of households receiving benefits. He also contributed to the development of budget standards used to assess the resources required by different types of households to achieve an acceptable standard of living. His comparative research examined social assistance, family benefits and child support arrangements across European countries.

Bradshaw contributed to studies of poverty and social exclusion for the Joseph Rowntree Foundation and other research organizations. His work on minimum income standards examined the costs of meeting household needs and the relationship between income adequacy and living standards. He also investigated the overlap between different dimensions of poverty, including low income and material deprivation.

A later focus of his research was the measurement of children's well-being. He contributed to comparative studies assessing children's material circumstances, health, education, relationships and subjective well-being across countries. He was involved in the development of international child well-being comparisons and the Children's Worlds project, which examines children's own accounts of their lives and well-being. His research has informed discussions about the measurement of child poverty and the evaluation of policies intended to improve children's living conditions.

Bradshaw also worked on the European Union's social policy research programme, serving as the United Kingdom coordinator of the European Social Policy Network. His research and policy work has addressed the measurement of extreme poverty, differences in welfare provision and the effects of economic and social policies on disadvantaged households.

== Other activities ==
Bradshaw stood for Parliament in the 1970 General Election as Labour Candidate for Thirsk and Malton and was a York City Councillor from 1970-1974. He co founded the York Welfare Benefits Unit and was Chair for 50 years. Bradshaw has served as an adviser to parliamentary and government bodies on social policy, including the House of Commons Work and Pensions Committee. He participated in technical and advisory groups concerned with measuring child poverty and developing anti-poverty strategies.

He has also been associated with the Child Poverty Action Group, where he served as a trustee and participated in its social policy work. His other professional activities included work with the International Social Security Association and editorial responsibilities for the journal Child Indicators Research.

== Awards and honours ==
In 1996, Bradshaw was elected a Fellow of the Academy of Social Sciences (FAcSS). Bradshaw was appointed Commander of the Order of the British Empire (CBE) in 2005 for services to child poverty. In 2010, he was elected a Fellow of the British Academy in recognition of his work in the social sciences. He received an honorary doctorate from the University of Turku in Finland in 2011 and an honorary doctorate from the University of Bath in 2015. In 2012, he was named an Honorary Fellow of UNICEF UK.

In 2024, Bradshaw received the Alfred J. Kahn and Sheila B. Kamerman Award from the International Society for Child Indicators for his contributions to research on child well-being and comparative indicators.

== Selected works ==
=== Books ===
- Bradshaw, Jonathan (1972), McLachlan, Gordon (ed.), Taxonomy of social need, London: Oxford University Press, pp. 71–82
- Bradshaw, Jonathan, ed. (1993). Budget standards for the United Kingdom. Aldershot: Avebury. ISBN 185628591X.
- Bradshaw, Jonathan; Skinner, Christine; Stimson, Carol; Williams, Julie (1999). Absent fathers?. London: Routledge. ISBN 0415215927.
- Bradshaw, Jonathan (2000). "Preface". In Rowntree, B. Seebohm (ed.). Poverty: a study of town life (2nd ed.). Bristol: Policy Press. ISBN 1861342020.
- Bradshaw, Jonathan; Mayhew, Emese (2005). The well-being of children in the UK (2nd ed.). London: Save the Children. ISBN 184187101X.
- Jonathan, Bradshaw, ed. (2008). Social security, happiness, and well-being. Antwerp: Intersentia. ISBN 978-9050958158.
- Bradshaw, Jonathan, ed. (2011). The well-being of children in the UK (3rd ed.). Bristol: Policy Press. ISBN 978-1847428363.
- Bradshaw, Jonathan; Harris, Toby, eds. (2014). Energy and Social Policy. London: Routledge. ISBN 978-1138833159.

=== Articles ===
- Bradshaw, Jonathan; Cooke, Kenneth; Godfrey, Christine (1983). "The Impact of Unemployment on the Living Standards of Families". Journal of Social Policy. 12 (4): 433–452. doi:10.1017/s0047279400013076. ISSN 0047-2794.
- Bradshaw, Jonathan; Mitchell, Deborah; Morgan, Jane (1987). "Evaluating Adequacy: The Potential of Budget Standards". Journal of Social Policy. 16 (2): 165–181. doi:10.1017/s0047279400020365. ISSN 0047-2794.
- BRADSHAW, JONATHAN; FINCH, NAOMI (2003). "Overlaps in Dimensions of Poverty". Journal of Social Policy. 32 (4): 513–525. doi:10.1017/s004727940300713x. ISSN 0047-2794.
- Bradshaw, Jonathan; Hoelscher, Petra; Richardson, Dominic (21 July 2006). "An Index of Child Well-being in the European Union". Social Indicators Research. 80 (1): 133–177. doi:10.1007/s11205-006-9024-z. ISSN 0303-8300.
- Bradshaw, Jonathan; Movshuk, Oleksandr (3 April 2019), "Measures of extreme poverty applied in the European Union", Absolute Poverty in Europe, Policy Press, pp. 39–72, doi:10.1332/policypress/9781447341284.003.0003, ISBN 978-1-4473-4128-4
- Bradshaw, Jonathan; Richardson, Dominic (1 April 2009). "An Index of Child Well-Being in Europe". Child Indicators Research. 2 (3): 319–351. doi:10.1007/s12187-009-9037-7. ISSN 1874-897X.
