= Minimum Income Standard =

The Minimum Income Standard (MIS) is a research method developed in the UK, and now applied in other countries, to identify what incomes different types of households require to reach a socially acceptable living standard. The term has also been used to describe political criteria used openly or implicitly by some governments to assess the adequacy of income levels. MIS is the basis for the calculation of the UK living wage.

== Origins ==
MIS was originally funded, in 2006, under the title of a Minimum Income Standard for Britain, by the Joseph Rowntree Foundation, and carried out in partnership by the Centre for Research in Social Policy (CRSP) at Loughborough University and the Family Budget Unit at the University of York. The research is now fully carried out by CRSP. MIS represents a budget standard in its specification of the level of disposable income households need in order to achieve an adequate standard of living. MIS may also be referred to as a reference budget, as it provides a costed list of items that households need to buy.

Unlike some other kinds of reference budget that draw heavily on expert input, MIS is informed by budget lists drawn up by members of the public, checked by experts, and approved by final ‘check-back’ groups of members of the public. The use of consensual focus groups was developed at CRSP in the 1990s, while the FBU focused on expert-based standards. MIS brought these two approaches together. Detailed research with members of the public takes forward work by Peter Townsend (sociologist) on relative poverty and low income, which argued that living conditions must be seen in the context of widely held expectations of the resources that members of a society should have. The first MIS orientation groups were tasked with setting a definition of MIS, which continues to be used to define the Minimum Income Standard for the United Kingdom: ‘a minimum standard of living in Britain today includes, but is more than just, food, clothes and shelter. It is about having what you need in order to have the opportunities and choices necessary to participate in society’.

The original research was carried out in Britain in 2007 and the findings presented in 2008 were costed using April 2008 prices. Every July, new MIS figures are published, updated to April of the same year. The updates take on board inflation and changes in minimum needs.

The most recent Minimum Income Standard Report in 2017, funded by Trust for London, found that 39% of Londoners have an income below the Minimum Income Standard. This is higher than the rate of 30% in the UK as a whole.

== Method ==
MIS researchers facilitate a sequence of deliberative Focus groups, all of which have detailed negotiations to come to a consensus about the things a household would have to be able to afford in order to achieve an acceptable living standard. Three waves of groups identify and check which items are to be included, with each successive group either corroborating or amending the decisions of previous groups.

Groups are made up of people from a mixture of socio-economic backgrounds but all participants within each group are from the type of household under discussion. For example, pensioner groups decide the minimum for pensioners.

The MIS method develops negotiated consensus through projection, whereby group members are asked not to think of their own needs and tastes but of the needs of hypothetical individuals or case studies. Participants are asked to imagine they are in the home of the individuals under discussion and to explain what items they would need in their everyday life to reach the living standard set out in the definition of MIS. Where groups fall short of consensus, subsequent groups help to resolve differences.

Experts check that these specifications adequately fulfil needs relating to nutrition and fuel consumption and, in some cases, feed information back to subsequent research groups that check and amend the budgets.

== UK Variations ==
In identifying things that everyone should be able to afford, MIS does not attempt to specify extra requirements for particular individuals and groups: for example, those resulting from living in a remote location or having a disability. So, not everybody who has more than the minimum income can be guaranteed to achieve an acceptable living standard. However, someone falling below the minimum is unlikely to achieve such a standard.

MIS was originally calculated as a minimum for Britain; subsequent research in Northern Ireland in 2009 showed that the required budgets there are all close to those in the rest of the United Kingdom, so the national budget standard now applies to the whole of the UK. This standard was calculated based on the needs of people in urban areas. Further projects have looked at how requirements differ in rural areas and in London, respectively.

CRSP has also carried out research to further understanding of additional costs of living for households with additional needs. Research that produced minimum budgets for people with visual impairment and people with hearing loss was conducted in 2015 and 2016. This was funded by Thomas Pocklington Trust.

== UK Applications ==
The calculation for the Living Wage is based on MIS and is used by the Living Wage Foundation to accredit Living Wage Employers. The uprating of the Living Wage figure each year takes account of rises in living costs and any changes in what people define as a ‘minimum’. The present system, using MIS to calculate living costs separately for London and the rest of the UK, was designed in 2016 under the supervision of the Living Wage Commission, to replace the previous systems in which the London and out of London rates had been set using different methods. The Commission distinguished the independent, accredited Living Wage from the so-called "National Living Wage" (a higher statutory minimum for over-25s introduced by the UK Government in 2016), as follows:

The defining feature that differentiates the independent Living Wage rates from the statutory wage floors is that they are based on analysis of the specific goods and services that employees and their families need to meet a minimum acceptable standard of living. It is important that this basket of goods is regularly updated, based on the views and experiences of ordinary people across all four nations of the UK about what is required to fully participate in society, and how social norms and needs change over time. The Living Wage Commission currently views the Minimum Income Standard research carried out by the Centre for Research in Social Policy at Loughborough University as the best available source for this basket of goods.

MIS has been used in evidence in a landmark High Court ruling on asylum seekers’ benefits and in evidence put to the Welfare Reform and Work Public Bill Committee about reforming child poverty targets. The Scottish Government has used evidence from CRSP to encourage all Scottish employers to pay the Living Wage, and the Scottish Government itself has committed to paying the Living Wage as part of its public sector pay policy.

The Minimum Income Calculator is an online tool that can be used by members of the public to calculate the minimum budget for their own household.

== Development in Other Countries ==
Outside the United Kingdom, the CRSP team has applied the method in Guernsey and supported studies in other countries. Projects adopting the MIS method have been undertaken in the Republic of Ireland, France, Japan, Portugal and Austria. Exploratory projects in Mexico and South Africa have been supported by CRSP.

== MIS and Poverty ==
MIS is relevant to the discussion of poverty, but does not claim to be a poverty threshold. This is because participants in the research were not specifically asked to talk about what defines poverty. However, it is relevant to the poverty debate in that almost all households officially defined as being in income poverty (having below 60 percent of median income) are also below MIS. Thus households classified as in relative income poverty are generally unable to reach an acceptable standard of living as defined by members of the public.
