= Centre for Research in Social Policy =

British research centre

- Abbreviation: CRSP
- Formation: 1983
- Headquarters: Loughborough University
- Location: United Kingdom
- Official language: English
- Co-Directors: Professor Abigail Davis and Professor Matt Padley
- Staff: 10
- Website: crsp.ac.uk

The Centre for Research in Social Policy (CRSP) is a self-funding research centre based within the Department of Social Sciences at Loughborough University in the market town of Loughborough, Leicestershire, in the East Midlands, England.

The Centre conducts research in the field of social policy and aims to improve the quality and flow of information on which policy decisions are made.

The current co-directors are Professor Abigail Davis and Professor Matt Padley.

== Research themes ==
The Centre specialises in applied social policy research and policy analysis on issues around minimum income, poverty, and living standards. CRSP’s core research programme is the Minimum Income Standard for the United Kingdom (MIS).

== Regular outputs ==
Minimum Income Standard.

Minimum Income Standard (MIS) refers to how much disposable income households need in order to achieve an adequate standard of living.

The Centre regularly conducts a calculation of this standard for UK households. The MIS research and its analysis and dissemination is funded by the Joseph Rowntree Foundation. MIS takes into account differences in household needs and in social opinion of what a decent standard of living is. The calculation of the MIS is based on detailed research with groups of members of the public. Experts on nutrition and heating are consulted to ensure budgets provide adequately for healthy living. Calculations are updated annually, based on inflation, and reviewed every two years, based on new research, to reflect changing social norms.

Projects adopting the MIS method are currently being undertaken in the Republic of Ireland, France, Japan, Portugal and Austria. CRSP is now exploring the use of MIS in Mexico, South Africa and Thailand.

CRSP provides a Minimum Income Calculator.

=== Calculation of the Living Wage. ===
MIS is the basis for calculating the Living Wage rate used by the Living Wage Foundation as the basis for accrediting Living Wage employers. Up to 2015, CRSP calculated the out-of-London rate, based on the wage that households needed in order to have a minimum acceptable standard of living. In 2016, the Living Wage Commission endorsed a new, independent method for setting rates in London and in the rest of the UK, using MIS to measure living costs in both cases.

=== Universal Credit. ===
MIS is also used to monitor the impact of Universal Credit.

=== The Cost of a Child. ===
This research project calculates the cost of raising a child in the United Kingdom. Results indicate that childcare and other expenses in the United Kingdom have been rising more rapidly than family incomes. As a consequence, families both in low-paid jobs and out of work are falling further short of affording a minimum living standard. This project is funded by the Child Poverty Action Group.

=== Households Below Minimum Income Standard. ===
CRSP has analysed the Family Resources Survey to estimate the number of households in different groups with disposable incomes below MIS and below a certain percentage of MIS.

== Examples of recent studies ==
=== A Minimum Income Standard for London. ===
This study looks at how differences between life in the capital and the rest of the country affect the minimum cost of living. Using focus groups to identify what additional or different requirements Londoners have from other people in the UK, this project also includes research on price differences to determine a socially acceptable standard of living for London. As of 2017 this research will be used to determine the London living wage.

=== Minimum Income Standard for people who are sight impaired and people who are deaf. ===
This research, funded by Thomas Pocklington Trust, begins to fill the gap in knowledge about the true financial cost of disability for households. CRSP is continuing this work to look at the effects of level of impairment and life stage.

=== Bringing up a family: Making ends meet. ===
This project, funded by the Joseph Rowntree Foundation, augments work on Households Below Minimum Income Standard and the Cost of a Child analysis. The research furthers understanding about the financial challenges that families living below MIS face, drawing on in-depth interviews held in urban and rural locations in the south west, midlands and north west of England with parents in households whose income is between 50 and 90 percent of MIS.

=== The Costs of Fostering. ===
Based on the MIS methodology, this project explores the costs of fostering for four age groups of children (infant, preschool, primary school and secondary school).

== Examples of past studies ==
During the 1990s, CRSP pioneered research on consensual budget standards. Since then, research has concentrated on living standards and income and in evaluating the impact of social benefits on living conditions. Some of the most relevant projects have been:

Family Fortunes: pressures on parents and children in the 1990s.

This was an early example of developing a “consensual” budget standard, applied to the needs of children.

Small Fortunes: Spending on children, childhood poverty and parental sacrifice.

Published in 1997, the Small Fortunes Survey was the first ever nationally representative survey of the lifestyles and living standards of British children.

Local Housing Allowance.

As part of a consortium, CRSP evaluated the Local Housing Allowance Pathfinders for the Department for Work and Pensions.

== History ==
The Centre for Research in Social Policy (CRSP) was founded in 1983 by Professor Sir Adrian Webb. CRSP’s main funding source when the Centre was founded was the Department of Health.

In 1990, following the appointment of Professor Robert Walker as Director, CRSP expanded its research interests and its funding base. It took on a range of large government evaluations as well as carrying out research on lifestyles and living standards. In the early 2000s, the Centre had up to 27 staff.

In 2012, following a change in the funding environment and the development of MIS, the Centre reoriented itself to become smaller and more focused on income and living standards.

=== Directors ===
- Professor (later Sir) Adrian Webb (1983)
- Professor Robert Walker (1990)
- Bruce Stafford and Sue Middleton (2000)
- Professor Alan France (2006)
- Dr Noel Smith (2011)
- Professor Donald Hirsch (2012)
- Professor Abigail Davis and Professor Matt Padley (2022)
