= Resolution Foundation =

Independent British think tank

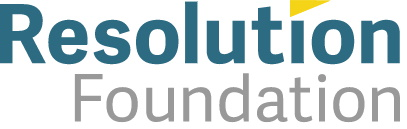
- Formation: 2005; 21 years ago
- Type: Think tank
- Headquarters: London
- Official language: English
- Chief Executive: Ruth Curtice
- Revenue: £1,871,125 (2019)
- Expenses: £1,756,236 (2019)
- Website: resolutionfoundation.org

The Resolution Foundation is an independent British think tank established in 2005. Its stated aim is to improve the standard of living of low- to middle-income families.

== Appointments ==
From 2005 to 2010, Sue Regan served as the chief executive of the organisation. She was succeeded by Gavin Kelly, who led the organisation from 2010 to 2015. Following his tenure, Kelly became the CEO of the Resolution Trust, the think tank's primary funder.

In June 2015, the former Conservative MP David Willetts took over as executive chairman. At the same time, Torsten Bell, a former senior advisor to Ed Miliband, was appointed as the organisation's director to lead what the Foundation described as "an expanded programme of work". By November 2019, Willetts had become president of the Foundation's Advisory Council and Intergenerational Centre, while Bell had advanced to the role of chief executive.

In May 2024, Bell departed from the organisation after being selected as Labour's candidate for Swansea West.

In November 2024, the Resolution Foundation announced the appointment of Ruth Curtice as its new chief executive.

== Publications ==
The Foundation has hosted a number of major reviews, and the commission on Living Standards, chaired by Clive Cowdery, ran from 2011 to 2012. The 'Resolution Foundation Review of the Future of the National Minimum Wage' in 2013 and 2014 was chaired by Sir George Bain, and set out proposals to strengthen the minimum wage. This report was referenced by Chancellor George Osborne when the National Living Wage was announced in 2015. The 'Intergenerational Commission' ran from 2016 to 2018, chaired by David Willetts. This was succeeded by the 'Intergenerational Centre', which was established "as a home for analysis and policy thinking on living standards through a generational lens".

In 2018, a Macroeconomic Policy Unit was established "with the aim of contributing to a more inclusive and better informed macroeconomic policy debate". The Resolution Foundation produces some recurring research publications. These include annual 'Low Pay Britain' reports, an annual 'Living Standards Audit', an annual 'Living Standards Outlook', and a quarterly 'Earnings Outlook'. The Foundation also calculates the rates of the voluntary UK and London Living Wages each year, on behalf of the Living Wage Foundation and using the Minimum Income Standard.

In March 2023, the Foundation shared research exclusively with BBC Panorama, which claimed that stalling wage growth since the 2008 financial crisis had left British workers £11,000 worse off a year. The Foundation released a report in April 2023, titled 'Low Pay Britain 2023: Improving low-paid work through higher minimum standards', stating that "good work" is needed to combat economic decline in Britain.

== Funding ==
In the year ending 30 September 2022, its annual income was £3,285,540. The bulk of its funding comes from the Resolution Trust established by Clive Cowdery in addition to the Federation of Small Businesses, the Nuffield Foundation, the Rowntree trusts and others. It has been awarded an A rating for transparency by the Who Funds You? project and is quoted more often by political parties that are left of centre.

== See also ==
- Income in the United Kingdom
- Poverty in the United Kingdom
