= Poverty in the United Kingdom =

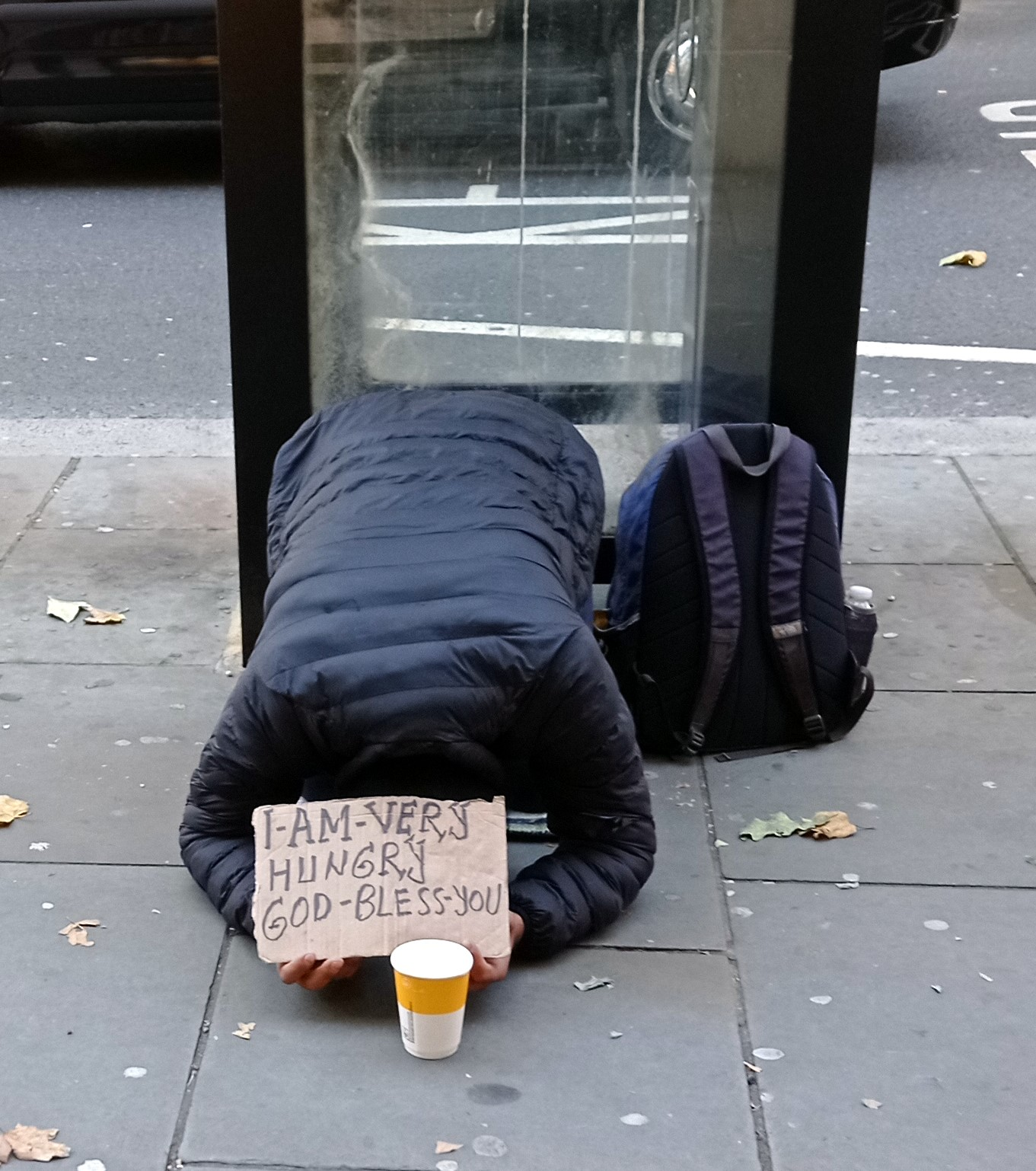
A beggar in Sloane Square in London

Poverty in the United Kingdom is the condition experienced by the portion of the population of the United Kingdom that lacks adequate financial resources for a certain standard of living, as defined under the various measures of poverty.

Data based on incomes published in 2016 by the Department for Work and Pensions (DWP) show that, after housing costs have been taken into consideration, the number of people living in the UK in relative poverty to be 13.44M (21% of the population). The Joseph Rowntree Foundation (JRF), reported that in 2021, about 1 in 5 ( 20%) of people in the UK lived in poverty. In their report, the JRF said that over the last 25 years, children have had the highest poverty rates. Despite this, poverty in children has still gone down significantly, going from about a third (34%) of all children living in poverty to what it is today (27%).

In 2019, Full Fact found that the British poverty rate is "almost exactly the same level as the EU average (17%)", much lower than the DWP figures due to differences in calculation methods between countries.

In 2018, Philip Alston, the UN Special Rapporteur on extreme poverty and human rights said that British Government policies and cuts to social support "are entrenching high levels of poverty and inflicting unnecessary misery", "driven by a political desire to undertake social re-engineering rather than economic necessity". His report was rejected by the British Government, pointing to rising household incomes, declining income inequality and one million people fewer in absolute poverty since 2010.

== History ==
=== Before 1950s ===
The history of poverty in the United Kingdom before 1950 reflects a complex interplay of social, economic, and political forces that shaped the lives of the lower classes for centuries. From medieval serfdom to the industrial working poor, poverty remained a persistent challenge despite evolving systems of welfare and reform.

==== Medieval and Early Modern Periods ====
During the medieval period, poverty was often viewed through a religious and moral lens. Many poor people lived under feudal obligations, where subsistence living was the norm. The Church and local communities provided charity, but assistance was inconsistent and informal. The dissolution of the monasteries (1536–1541) under Henry VIII removed a key source of charitable relief, contributing to increased visible poverty and vagrancy.

In response, the Tudor state introduced laws to control and assist the poor. The Elizabethan Poor Law of 1601 formalised local responsibility for the destitute, distinguishing between the "deserving" and "undeserving" poor. This system placed the burden of care on parishes, supported by local taxes known as poor rates.

==== Industrial Revolution and 19th Century ====
The Industrial Revolution (late 18th to early 19th century) transformed the UK economy, but it also exacerbated poverty. Rapid urbanisation led to overcrowded slums, unsanitary living conditions, and insecure employment. Wages for factory and agricultural workers were often low, and child labour was widespread.

The Poor Law Amendment Act of 1834 marked a significant shift, aiming to reduce costs and discourage reliance on relief. It introduced the workhouse system, where conditions were deliberately harsh to deter applicants. This approach drew criticism for its cruelty, especially during times of economic downturn.

Throughout the 19th century, poverty was also addressed by philanthropic initiatives and the rise of reform movements. Campaigns for public health, housing reform, and education reflected growing concern about urban poverty. The later part of the century saw incremental state intervention, such as the Factory Acts, which improved labour conditions, and the Education Act 1870, which began to address child illiteracy.

==== Early 20th Century to 1950 ====
By the early 20th century, the limitations of the Poor Law system were increasingly evident. Reports like Charles Booth's surveys in London and Seebohm Rowntree's studies in York revealed widespread poverty even among those in employment, challenging the belief that poverty was solely due to individual failure.

The Liberal welfare reforms (1906–1914) introduced measures such as old-age pensions, labour exchanges, and national insurance for sickness and unemployment. These were early steps toward a modern welfare state.

The interwar years (1918–1939) saw rising unemployment, particularly in industrial regions, due to economic instability and the Great Depression. The Means Test, introduced during this time, became a symbol of state intrusion and was widely resented by the poor.

World War II brought new levels of state involvement in welfare, with rationing, evacuation, and employment controls helping reduce some aspects of poverty. The war also laid the groundwork for post-war reforms.

By 1950, the UK had begun implementing the Beveridge Report's recommendations, leading to the creation of the National Health Service (1948) and a more comprehensive social security system, effectively ending the era of the Poor Law and fundamentally changing how poverty was addressed.

=== 1950s and 1960s ===
In the early-1950s, it was believed by numerous people that poverty had been all but abolished from Britain, with only a few isolated pockets of deprivation still remaining. Much of this assumption was derived from a 1951 study which showed that in 1950 only 1.5% of the survey population lived in poverty, compared with 18% in 1936 when a previous study had been conducted in York Joseph Rowntree Charitable Trust. A leader in The Times spoke positively of this 'remarkable improvement – no less than the virtual abolition of the sheerest want.'

Over the course of the 1950s and 1960s, however, a "rediscovery" of poverty took place, with various surveys showing that a substantial proportion of Britons was impoverished, with between 4–12% of the population estimated to be living below the Supplementary Benefits' scales. In 1969, Professor A. Atkinson stated that

it seems fair to conclude that the proportion of the population with incomes below the National Assistance/Supplementary Benefits scale lies towards the upper end of the 4–9 per cent.

According to this definition, 2–5 million Britons were trapped in poverty. In addition, some 2.6 million people were in receipt of Supplementary Benefits and therefore living on the poverty line. This meant that at least 10% of the population were in poverty at this time. Bad housing conditions also constituted a major cause of poverty in the post-war era. In the early-1960s, it was estimated that three million families lived in "slums, near slums on grossly overcrowded conditions", while a 1967 housing survey of England and Wales found that 11.7% of all dwellings were unfit.

In their 1965 study on poverty, "The Poor and the Poorest," Professors Peter Townsend and Brian Abel-Smith decided to measure poverty on the basis of the National Assistance levels of living and estimated that some 14% (around 7.5 million) of Britons lived in poverty. Townsend and Abel-Smith also estimated that since the mid-1950s the percentage of the population living in poverty had risen from 8–14%.

==== Differences in health between the classes ====
The continued existence of poverty in the 1960s was also characterised by differences in health between different social classes. In 1964–65, the incidence of infant deaths was more than half as much higher in the two lowest social classes than in the two highest social classes. In 1961–62, 28% of all men recorded at least one spell of sickness of four days or more. For the lowest social classes, however, 35% of men had experienced this, compared with 18% of men in the highest social classes. There is evidence that in large families the height of children was less than that for the average, while families with three or more children were more likely to be inadequately nourished.

=== 1970s and 1980s ===
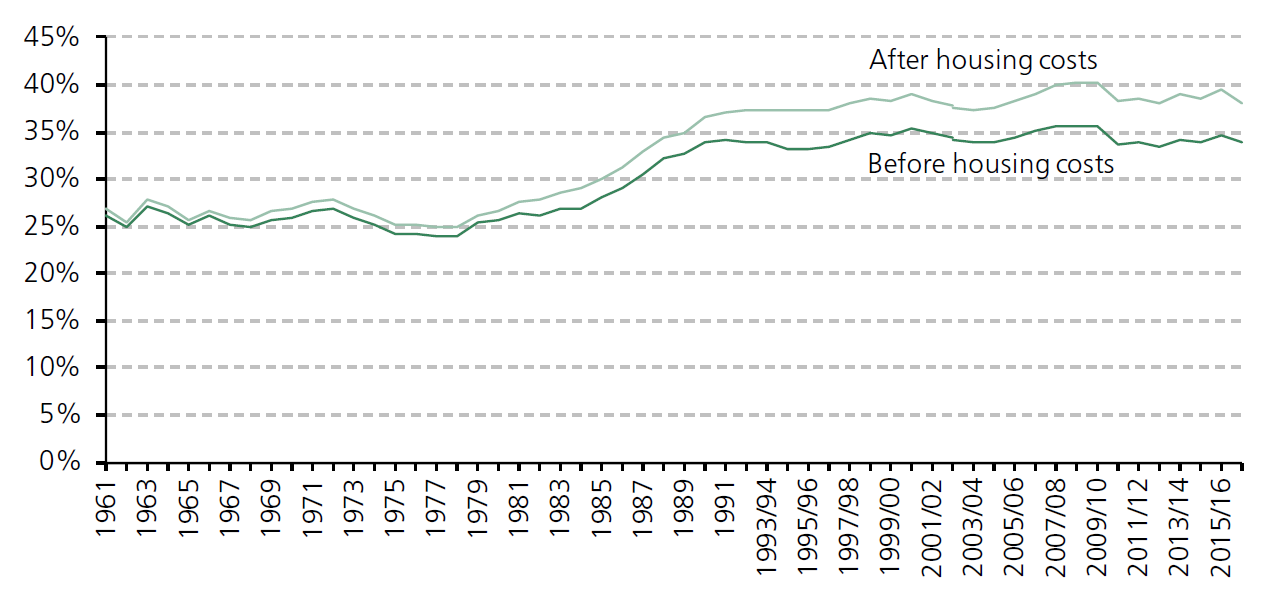
British disposable income Gini coefficient, a measure of income inequality, showing the significant increase of income inequality during the 1980s

In his 1979 work "Poverty in the UK", Townsend suggested that 15 million people lived in or on the margins of poverty. He also argued that to get a proper measure of relative deprivation, there was a need to take into account other factors apart from income measures such as peoples' environment, employment, and housing standards.

According to one study, in 1966, 365,000 families in Great Britain were in poverty by an old assistance standard; and 450,000 families by a new standard. In another study on poverty, Wilfred Beckerman estimated that 9.9% of the British population lived below a standardised poverty line in 1973, compared with 6.1% of the population of Belgium.

Low pay was also a major cause of poverty, with a report by the TUC in 1968 finding that about 5 million females and about 2.5 million males earned less than £15 a week (equivalent to £219.64 in 2024). According to one study, around 20-23% of employees in the late-1960s had low hourly wages. A New Earnings Survey for 1971 found that in April 1971 the average weekly earnings of male manual workers stood at £29.40 and those of female manual workers £15.30, but there were 3.4 million women and 1.2 million men earning less than £20 a week at that time. In 1974, one-quarter of adult employees in Britain earned less than £27 a week or less before tax, only slightly above the officially defined poverty line for an average family.

Regional differences in pay also remained pronounced during the post-war period. Slum housing also remained a problem, with 12% of British households living in houses or flats considered to be unfit for human habitation in 1972. In 1975, government statistics estimated that 1,800,000 children lived in poverty. Nevertheless, the number of people estimated to be living in poor housing conditions was lower at the start of the 1970s than at the start of the 1960s. In 1961, 4,700,000 households lived in unfit or substandard homes, compared with 2,846,000 in 1971.

During the late-1960s and throughout the 1970s, progress was made in reducing the level of post-war poverty and inequality, with 3 million families in Britain in poverty in 1977, compared with 5 million in 1961. According to the 1971 Supplementary Benefits scale, the percentage of individuals living in poverty fell from 9.4% in 1963 to 2.3% in 1973. Low pay continued to remain a major problem by the end of the 1970s, however, particularly amongst manual workers.

Based on various measurements, however, the number of Britons living in poverty rose significantly from 1979-85. The number of Britons living in poverty (when defined as living below the Supplementary Benefit level) rose from 2,090,000 to 2,420,000 during that period, whilst the number of people living in poverty when defined as living on or below the Supplementary Benefit level rose from 6,070,000 to 9,380,000. Using a poverty measurement of living at 140% of the Supplementary Benefit level or below, the rise was from 11,570,000 to 15,420,000.

From 1979–87, the number of Britons living in poverty (defined as living on less than half the national average income) doubled, from roughly 10% to 20% of the whole population. In 1989, almost 6 million full-time workers, representing 37% of the total full-time workforce, earned less than the "decency threshold" defined by the Council of Europe as 68% of average full-time earnings. In 1994, 76.7% of all part-time workers earned less than this threshold.

==== Comparison with the rest of Europe ====
Figures from the European Commission estimated that from 1975-85 the number of people living in poverty had doubled in Britain, from just over 3 million to 6.5 million. In 1975, the United Kingdom had fewer people living in poverty than Germany, Italy, Belgium, and Luxembourg. By 1989, Britain had a higher poverty level than each of these four countries. In 1989, 12% of the British population was estimated to be living in poverty, compared with 11.7% in Italy, 8.5% in Germany, 7.9% in Luxembourg, 7.4% in the Netherlands, and 7.2% in Belgium.

=== 1990s to 2000s ===
From the late-1990s onwards, however, poverty began to fall steadily; helped by policies such as big increases in National Insurance benefits and the National Minimum Wage Act 1998. Using the 60% of median income after housing costs poverty line, the percentage of the British population living in poverty rose to 25.3% in 1996/97, compared with 13.7% in 1979.

From 1997/98 to 2004/05 (using the same 60% of median income after housing costs measurement), the percentage of the population living in poverty fell from 24.4% to 20.5%. A 2000 report by the Joseph Rowntree Foundation estimated that 4,000,000 people lacked access to a healthy diet, while a review of EU food and health policies estimated that food poverty was far higher in the UK than any other EU member state.

== Poverty in the UK in the 21st century ==
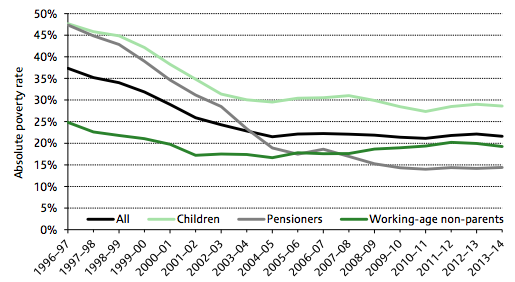
REQUIRES CITATION Relative poverty rates (After Housing Costs) in the UK, 1997-2014. Figures are for Great Britain until 2001–02 and for the whole of the British (i.e. including Northern Ireland) from 2002–03 onwards. The relative poverty line is defined as 60% of median income in 2010–11.

Rates of poverty fell just before the turn of the century and continued to do so until 2004–05. The Institute of Fiscal Studies has counted the number of people in poverty as falling from c.37% in 1996/7 (21.8m people) to c.22% in 2004/5 (13.2m), a figure that remained the same in 2014/5 (14.1m taking population growth into account).

The trend for Relative Poverty is the same (a fall in the number of poor from 1997–98 until 2004–05 and a relatively stable amount since then), although the earlier numbers are lower. Alternatively, it is suggested poverty rose from about 2008–12 but remained stable since then. Socially excluded people are ten times more likely to die early compared to the general population.

Changes to the UK benefits system from April 2017, such as not allowing some claimants to claim for more than two children, were predicted to increase the number of families in poverty and push a quarter of a million additional children into poverty. Parents sometimes went without food themselves in order to care for children, and others could not afford clothes, toothbrushes, or toothpaste. Basic hygiene products like shampoo and sanitary towels are sometimes hard for poor people to afford, and some must choose between buying hygiene products and buying food. Just under one in five British children under 15 suffers food insecurity. That means sufficient safe, nutritious food cannot be guaranteed.

The current minimum wage has been described by charities and campaign groups (like the Living Wage Foundation) as insufficient to cover the cost of basic living expenses. Nearly half of schools provide anti-poverty services like food banks, clothes banks or emergency loans to families. Alison Garnham of the Child Poverty Action Group said, "With nine children in every classroom of 30 falling below the official poverty line, it is time to rebuild the safety net for struggling families." Children become sick because they cannot keep warm at home; overcrowding and damp worsens respiratory conditions.

Eurostat figures showed that the numbers of Britons at risk of poverty fell to 15.9% in 2014, down from 17.1% in 2010 and 19% in 2005 (after social transfers were taken into account). However, the Joseph Rowntree Foundation (JRF) feared that people who were "just about managing" could fall into poverty. One-third of British households are living below what is considered an adequate income according to the JRF research. Poverty exists in rural communities as well as in urban areas. Rural poverty is frequently overlooked.

The most common form of child poverty in 2017 was poverty in working families. About 30% of British children were classed as poor and of those two-thirds were from working families. Analysts suggested that cuts to working-age benefits would likely increase poverty rates greatly during the three years following 2017.

In-work poverty can be compounded by employees who do not get the pay that they are entitled to. A 2017 report by Middlesex University and Trust for London revealed that at least 2,000,000 workers in Britain were losing an estimated £3,000,000,000 in unpaid holiday pay and wages per year. It suggested that withholding holiday pay, not paying wages and workers losing a couple of hours money per week were some of the deliberate strategies used by employers to increase their profits.

Food Standards Agency (FSA) research suggested some poor people missed meals or went without healthy food due to financial pressure. One-third of unemployed people skipped meals or reduced the quality of their diet due to lack of money. 8% of respondents to a survey had low or very low food security, suggesting just under 4,000,000 adults regularly struggled to get enough to eat. Other studies showed benefit freezes together with rising food prices were major factors in food insecurity. Campaigners and MPs urged the British government to monitor food insecurity. Ministers so far declined, but the Scottish Government agreed to enact a food insecurity measure. Women and young people are more likely to live in food insecure households.

The Institute for Fiscal Studies said the benefit rate freeze and child tax credit cuts, together with the rollout of Universal Credit, which is less generous due to changes in work allowances, means, "large losses" for low-income households. John McDonnell said the IFS analysis showed a "clear threat" to working people's living standards, while the Liberal Democrats said that the "savage cuts" would make millions of households poorer. Projected benefit cuts will lead to the poorest working-age households losing between 4% and 10% of their income a year, according to the IFS. Fewer than one in ten British people believe all work is fair and decent, and 75% think more should be done to make work fairer. Many British people suffer insecure work with zero hours contracts.

The Guardian reported that half of workers in 2017 were anxious over basic household expenses like food, transport and energy. One in six workers had left the heating off despite it being cold to save on fuel bills, and similar numbers had pawned possessions in the previous year because they were short of money. The Guardian reported in 2017 that rents were rising and housing benefit was not rising to match this. Families were forced into increasing poverty, with some facing a daily struggle to pay their rent and buy enough food. Some risked homelessness. Families with children were most affected and two-thirds of affected families were in work.

Homelessness rose in the six years up to 2017 and the National Audit Office said in 2017 that welfare reforms and a freeze in housing benefit were a likely cause. Over a million vulnerable people with low incomes were experiencing worse poverty because they had to rent in the private rental sector since social accommodation was in short supply. A shortage of social housing caused the private rented sector to double over 25 years. That forced more households on benefits with dependent children or a disabled person, to pay appreciably more for inappropriate housing. Benefit sanctions drove tenants into rent arrears, leading in some cases to evictions and homelessness. 38% of the private rented sector were low income households, classed as vulnerable and 90% of these were either in poverty or living in overcrowded conditions. The short supply of social housing enables private landlords to charge more than housing associations, frequently for worse accommodation.

An All Party Parliamentary Group on Hunger warned in 2017 that too many poorer British children were hungry or malnourished during school holidays. Some subsisted on a diet of crisps or stodgy food. 1,000,000 children who received free school meals during term-time were at risk, as were 2,000,000 more from working poor families. For both types, school holidays added to financial pressure on families through the need to pay for childcare, food and energy bills. These children returned to school in poor physical shape and did not learn as well as children who were better fed during school holidays. The life chances of underfed children were damaged.

When housing benefit does not fully cover rent, people can struggle to pay rent and buy other necessities as well. This can lead to increasing debt. Anne Baxendale of Shelter, said: "We are deeply concerned that the current freeze on housing benefit is piling a huge amount of pressure on to thousands of private renters who are already teetering on the brink of homelessness." People are forced out of their homes because they cannot pay their rent and all their other bills.

As of 2017, 20% of Britons lived in poverty including 8,000,000 working-age adults, 4,000,000 children and 1,900,000 pensioners. Research by the JRF found nearly 400,000 more British children and 300,000 more British pensioners were in poverty in 2016–17 compared with 2012–13.

From April 2018, child benefit will be limited to the first two children, which will affect 150,000 families. Withdrawal of family element from new Universal Credit claims and tax credit claims for families with children will affect 400,000 families.

Single parents are particularly heavily affected by benefit sanctions. A 2018 report from Gingerbread and Trust for London showed that three times as many single parents were sanctioned under JSA in 2016–17 than 2005–06. These sanctions can compound the financial hardship of those already on a low income.

In 2018, Citizens Advice stated that up to 140,000 households went without power as they could not afford to top up pre-payment meters and most such households included children or someone with a long-term health problem. The Living Wage Foundation stated many poorest parents went without meals, one-third of parents on low incomes do this regularly through lack of money. Roughly half of those families are behind with household bills.

TUC sponsored research indicated that 3,100,000 children in working families would be below the official breadline in 2018, a million more than in 2010. About 600,000 children with working parents became poor due to the government's benefit cuts and public sector pay limits, the report by the consultancy Landman Economics stated. The research found that the biggest increase in child poverty among working families would be in the East Midlands, followed by the West Midlands and Northern Ireland. Teachers and teaching assistants brought items into schools like food, sanitary products and toilet paper for children from families who were short of those things.

Inflation has been rising while the level of many benefits has remained fixed in money terms. This is causing hardship to low-income families and there are calls for the level of benefits to be increased. Over 14,000,000 people, as well as 4,500,000 children, live below the breadline, and over half are trapped in poverty for years. Poverty is particularly frequent in families with a disabled person, single-parent families, and households where no one works or that are dependent for income on irregular or zero-hours jobs. 12% of the British population spent the bulk or all of the four years to 2018 below the breadline.

Many poor people live in areas where there is no large supermarket nearby and must rely on corner shops where prices are higher and the food range is smaller. Poor people in these areas cannot easily afford to buy fresh fruit and vegetables or to travel to large supermarkets where there is healthier food at lower prices. Such areas include: Marfleet in Hull, Hartcliffe in Bristol, Hattersley in Greater Manchester, Everton in Liverpool and Sparkbrook in Birmingham. Eight of the ten most deprived areas in Scotland are in Glasgow, and three of the nine worst in Wales are in Cardiff. Poor people, older people and disabled people are most affected when fresh food is not available locally. Nearly 4,000,000 British children are judged to live in households that would find it difficult to afford enough fruit, vegetables and other healthy foods to reach official guidelines, the Food Foundation maintains. Food prices increased by 7.7% from 2002–16, while the poorest families' incomes fell by 7.1%.

Rising poverty and austerity put pressure on low-income families and increase the number of children taken into care. Children in the poorest areas were 19 times more likely to be subject to a child protection plan or to be subject to care proceedings than children in wealthier areas. Citizens Advice maintains over one-third of people subject to the freeze on benefits have under £100 a month to live on after paying for rent, council tax, gas, electricity and food.

There were 56,210 emergency admissions for pneumonia in England from April 2018 to March 2019 among patients 18 years old or younger. From April 2008 to March 2009 there were only 36,862 such admissions. Hospital admissions were higher in deprived parts of England. WHO maintains crowded housing, indoor air pollution, parental smoking, lack of breastfeeding, and malnutrition are known to increase the risk of childhood pneumonia.

Disabled people and their carers are disproportionately frequently in poverty. Disabled living is more expensive than living for able bodied people and disability benefits do not cover the extra cost. Disabled people frequently claim other benefits as well as disability benefits and many of these benefits have been frozen during austerity whilst prices have risen.

Poor people develop ill health at an earlier age than better off people. Poorer men on average are diagnosed with their first serious long-term illness when they are 56 and poorer women at 55. In the poorest places, women develop their first serious long-term illness at only 47 and men at 49. Poor health reduces economic productivity and, since health is worse in the north of England, this is a factor in low economic productivity in the north.

In November 2023, The Trussell Trust calculated that a single adult in the UK in 2023 needs at least £29,500 a year to have an acceptable standard of living, up from £25,000 in 2022. Two partners with two children would need £50,000, compared to £44,500 in 2022. 29% of the UK population – which works out to 19.2 million people – belong to households that bring in below a minimum figure.

The 2023 Social Mobility Commission report found overall social mobility in the UK "has remained fairly constant for many decades", and that adults with lower working-class parents are about three times more likely to also have lower working-class jobs (30%) than adults with higher professional parents (11%).

=== Reactions to poverty ===
The Office for National Statistics has estimated that in 2011, 14,000,000 people were at risk of poverty or social exclusion. Poverty among young people increased by 3.9% from 2007-10. In assessing social inequality in Britain, Danny Dorling said that "people in different parts of Britain and people living within different quarters of its cities are living in different worlds with different norms and expectations. This was not the case a few decades ago. This is not the case to the same extent in the majority of affluent nations in the world."

In 2016, a new term reportedly appeared, 'Just About Managing' or 'JAM'. This applies to people who can put food on the table and pay rent or mortgage at least part of the time but have problems if their income falls or if there are unexpected bills. JAMs are typically families where at least one person works. JAMs may suffer social exclusion being unable to afford holidays or evenings out.

The Resolution Foundation claimed that the incomes of the poorest 10% in the UK would fall by 3% in real terms by 2020 due to government policies on tax and welfare. The lowest third of incomes were forecast to suffer falls in income over the coming years. Incomes will fall because many welfare benefits that poorer people receive have been frozen in cash terms and with inflation cash will be worth steadily less.

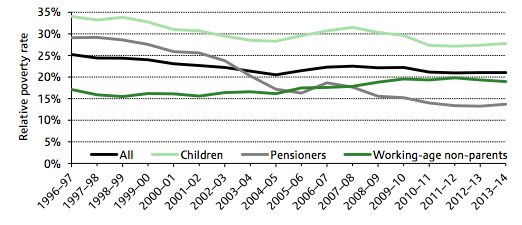
Relative poverty rates (After Housing Costs) in the UK, 1996-2014. Figures are presented for GB up until 2001–02 and for the whole of the UK from 2002–03 onwards. The relative poverty line is defined as 60% of the median income in each year.

In 2017–18, the Resolution Foundation said the official poverty rate increased from 22.1% to 23.2% and the child poverty rate rose in 2017–18 from 30.3% to 33.4%. Cuts to benefits and inflation are blamed for the rise, benefit levels have remained unchanged in money terms while inflation erodes their real value.

The Institute for Fiscal Studies reported the numbers of poor United Kingdom children in wage-earning families increased from 2009 to 14 and more poor children currently live in working families than live in families on benefits. The IFS reported "Recent falls in inequality are likely to prove temporary. Stronger earnings growth and the Conservatives' planned income tax cuts would do most for incomes towards the top of the distribution, while planned benefit cuts will hit low-income households [both in and out of work] hardest."

In 2018, the number of workers becoming poor despite working was rising faster than employment. 4,000,000 people were classed as working poor, that is one in every eight workers. Growing numbers of working parents find it more difficult to earn enough money for food, clothing and housing because of poor to no wage growth, reduction in welfare support and tax credits and the increasing cost of living. Children trapped in poverty increased by half a million during the five years to 2018 and reached 4.1 million in 2017. In a typical class of 30 children, nine would be in poverty. Over 14,000,000 people, about one in five of the British population were in poverty in 2018, according to the Joseph Rountree Foundation. Of them 8.2 million were working-age adults, 4.1 million were children and 1.9 million were pensioners. Eight million people lived in poverty in families where at least one person was working.

Julia Unwin of the Joseph Rowntree Foundation said: "A strong economy and rising employment have masked the growing problem of in-work poverty, as years of below-inflation wage rises have taken their toll on people's incomes. The upcoming minimum wage rise will help, but many low-income working families will still find themselves worse off due to tax-credit changes. Boosting productivity and creating more jobs which offer progression at work is vital to make work a reliable route out of poverty."

Campbell Robb of Shelter said: "It's heart-breaking to think that so many people are having to make a choice between paying the rent and putting food on the table, or living in fear that any drop in income would leave them unable to cover their housing costs. The sad truth is that far too many people in Britain right now are living in homes that just aren't up to scratch – from the thousands of families forced to cope with poor conditions, to a generation of renters forking out most of their income on housing each month and unable to save for the future."

As of 2015, there was hunger in the United Kingdom and significant numbers of people were driven to use food banks. There was also significant malnutrition. Poorer people were frequently forced to buy and eat cheaper, less healthy food. The BMJ, a British peer-reviewed medical journal published:

For the poorest in our society, up to 35% of disposable income will now be needed for food, compared to less than 9% for the more wealthy. This will increase reliance on cheap, highly processed, high fat, high sugar, high salt, and calorie-dense, unhealthy foods. Re-emerging problems of poor public health nutrition such as rickets and malnutrition in the elderly are also causes for concern.

— (John D Middleton Vice president John R Ashton, Simon Capewell Faculty of Public Health)

In 2016, 10% of British households lived in fuel poverty. Fuel poverty is calculated by gauging if a household's income would fall below the official poverty line after spending the actual amount needed to heat the home. The average fuel poverty gap of these households – that is, the amount needed to escape fuel poverty – is £371 a year, the latest figures indicate, with those in privately rented properties hit hardest.

In a 2013 report commissioned by the Joseph Rowntree Foundation poverty and participation are analysed as a social phenomenon characterising British society following the tradition initiated several decades ago by Peter Townsend. Participation in society is measured in terms of social relationships, membership of organisations, trust in other people, ownership of possessions and purchase of services. The study finds out that all these dimensions of participation are lower among people with low incomes. While participation generally drops as income declines, participation stops falling among the 30% or so of people with the lowest incomes, creating a participation 'floor'. The 30% of people with the lowest incomes are forced to choose between the basic necessities of modern life; they must decide which needs to neglect.

For people affected by the floor, additional income may well be spent on upgrading the quality of necessary goods and services rather than adding to them. Averages mask important variation. The participation floor for benefit recipients is lower than for other groups on the same income. Most ethnic minority groups experience greater material deprivation than the White majority but social participation is, on average, higher. Children's engagement in school life and friends is not directly affected by household income. However, parents on low incomes, on average, play less often with their children and spend less on activities. This is associated with poorer educational outcomes as judged by teachers. Low-income parents frequently spend more time than affluent ones assisting children with their school work because they have fallen behind their classmates.

Poverty and economic insecurity increase the risk that a person will commit suicide. In 2017, The Samaritans said that the British economic condition – including low incomes, job insecurity, zero-hours contracts, unmanageable debts and poor housing – all add to suicide risk. A report titled Dying from Inequality described "overwhelming evidence of a link between socioeconomic disadvantage and suicidal behaviour". "Men in the lowest social class, living in the most deprived areas, are up to 10 times more at risk of suicide than those in the highest social class living in the most affluent areas," the report says. Unemployed people are more at risk of suicide than people with work, people with low education and people living in deprived areas are also at increased risk.

In 2017, inequality was forecast to return to the levels of the Thatcher years. Torsten Bell of the Resolution Foundation, said that low- and middle-income families with children were set to be the worst affected by inflation rises, productivity flatlines and slow employment growth. Bell said: "This could leave Britain with the worst of both worlds on living standards – the weak income growth of the last parliament and rising inequality from the time Margaret Thatcher was in Downing Street. The prime minister's focus on supporting just managing families is absolutely right."

==== Wales ====
Poverty within the UK is particularly concentrated in Wales. While the relative income-poverty rate for the UK stood at 16.8% in 2014, the same poverty rate for Wales stood at 23% in the same year. Poverty in Wales has remained in the 25% range, with only small dips throughout the last decade. While the trends correlate with overall reductions in less impoverished areas of the UK, it does not correlate with Scotland, who in the 1990s, had a relative similar poverty trend as Wales. Conservative attitudes began to grow during the time of the Labour Party in government during the 2000s, culminating in an overall negative opinion towards public spending increases beginning in the 2010s.

==== London ====
Data published in 2017 by the New Policy Institute and the Trust for London found that 27% of Londoners live in poverty, six percentage points higher than in the rest of England. This represents 2.3 million Londoners, 58% of whom are in a working family. Further research published by Trust for London, carried out by Loughborough University, found that two in five Londoners cannot afford what the public regard as a decent standard of living – one that allows them to meet their basic needs and participate in society at a minimum level. This is significantly higher than the 30% that fall below the standard in the UK as a whole, and represents 3.3 million Londoners.

== How poverty in the United Kingdom is defined and measured ==
=== Historical statistics on poverty ===
The table below shows the percentage of the population in poverty derived by three different measures: relative poverty (earning less than 60% of the median), the National Assistance scale and the Supplementary Benefits scale. Estimates from the National Institute of Economic and Social Research.

The United Kingdom currently does not have an official measurement of poverty.

Percentage of population in poverty
	Relative poverty		National assistance scale		Supplementary benefits scale	
Year	Households	Individuals	Households	Individuals	Households	Individuals
1953/54	6.5%	4.8%	6.5%	4.8%	22.5%	21.0%
1963	6.8%	5.5%	2.5%	1.4%	10.5%	9.4%
1967	5.8%	5.3%	0.9%	0.9%	6.0%	5.5%
1971	4.9%	4.2%	0.5%	0.5%	4.9%	4.2%
1973	4.3%	3.0%	0.3%	0.2%	3.5%	2.3%

Estimates of poverty in the United Kingdom from 1950 to 1975 (percentage of population)

1953–54: 1.2% (Abel-Smith and Townsend, FES) Unit: Household

1954: 12.3% (Gough and Stark, IR) Unit: Tax unit

1959: 8.8% (Gough and Stark, IR) Unit: Tax unit

1960: 3.8% (Abel-Smith and Townsend, FES) Unit: Household

1963: 9.4% (Gough and Stark, IR) Unit: Tax unit

1967: 3.5% (Atkinson, FES) Unit: Household

1969: 3.4% (Atkinson, FES) Unit: Household

1968–69: 6.4% (Townsend, Survey) Unit: Household

1971: 4.9% (Fiegehen et al., FES) Unit: Household

1975: 11.3% (Berthoud and Brown, GHS) Unit: Household

=== Poverty as 60 percent of median income ===
The most common measure for poverty, as used in the Child Poverty Act 2010, is 'household income below 60 percent of median income'. The median is such an income that exactly a half of households earn more than that and the other half earns less.

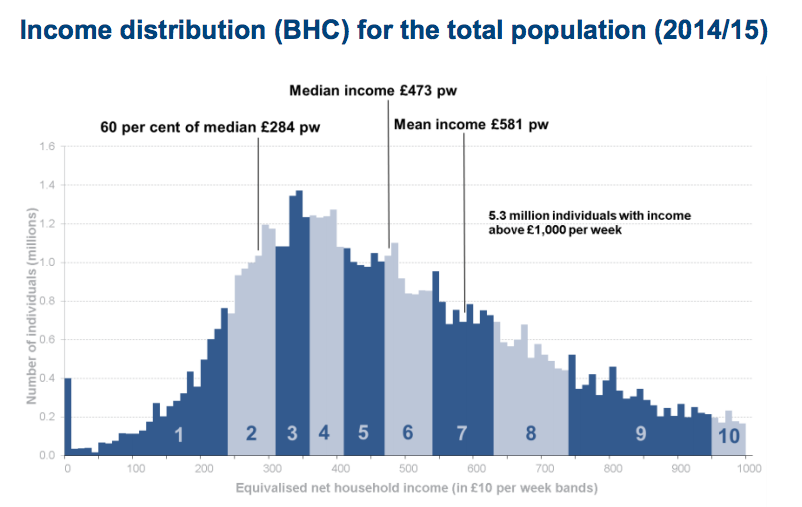
Income distribution (before housing costs) for the British total population (2014/15). In 2014/5, the median income in the UK was £473 per week (£24,596 a year). Those earning 60% of this figure (£284 a week / £14,758 a year) were considered to be in the low income bracket.

In 2014/5, the median income in the UK was £473 per week (£24,596 a year). Those earning 60% of this figure (£284 a week / £14,758 a year) were considered to be in the low income bracket.

This is the definition that is used by the British government's Department for Work and Pensions in its yearly survey Households below average income. However, their reports expressly avoid using the word poverty, using low income instead. Reports from others agencies, such as the Institute of Fiscal Studies Living Standards, Poverty and Inequality in the UK, use the same methodology, but specifically use the word poverty.

This measure can be further divided.

Those who live in absolute poverty have a 'household income below 60 percent of median income' as compared to a rate fixed in 2010/11 and that only changes in line with inflation.

Those who live in relative poverty have a 'household income below 60 percent of median income' as compared to all other incomes in the same year.

Absolute poverty is better at judging poverty in the short term, whereas relative poverty is better at seeing long-term trends. This is because general concepts of poverty change with time, and relative poverty reflects this better.

Reports on poverty also tend to take housing costs in to account, distinguishing between before housing costs (BHC, where housing costs such as rent and mortgage interest payments have not been deducted) and after housing costs (AHC). Different social groups in the UK tend to have vastly different costs for housing, affecting available income.

Relative poverty was used before its formal adoption now. In the early 1980s, Tony Byrne and Colin F. Padfield defined relative poverty in Britain as a situation in which people are able to survive adequately, but they are either less well off than they used to be (such as when they retire from paid employment) or that they are at a serious disadvantage "in their ability to experience or enjoy the standard of life of most other people – for example, not being able to afford an annual holiday."

In 2011, there was some discussion of the measurement for poverty being changed (from households earning less than 60% of median income) to a broader analysis of poverty.

=== The Consensual Method ===
As opposed to measuring income, the Consensual Method examines which necessities (e.g. food, clothing, access to healthcare, involvement in social and leisure activities) are thought by the general public to be essential for living in contemporary British society. Those families or individuals who lack a number of these necessities are considered as poor. In the 2012 Poverty and Social Exclusion (PSE) survey on Living Standards, the three necessities deemed as being most often essential to a good standard of living were the ability 'to warm living areas of the home ', a 'damp-free home' and 'two meals a day.'

Six specific surveys of low standards of living in the UK have made use of this method.

- 1983 Breadline Britain Survey
- 1990 Breadline Britain Survey of Britain
- 1999 Poverty and Social Exclusion Survey
- 2002 Poverty and Social Exclusion in Northern Ireland
- The 2012 PSE UK 'Attitudes to Necessities of Life and Services' survey
- The 2012 PSE UK 'Living Standards' survey

=== Social Metrics Commission ===
In 2018, the bipartisan Social Metrics Commission (housed by the Legatum Institute and run by CEO Philippa Stroud) proposed a New Poverty Measure to more fully capture the overall income and inescapable costs, and better identify who is in poverty. It found 14.2 million people in poverty, 7.7 million of whom are in persistent poverty. It is however still a relative measurement and does not evidence the real increases in the incomes of the poorest picked up by the standard absolute measurement of poverty. In February 2019, the Social Metrics Commission voluntarily adopted the code of practice for statistics. Later that year, the British Government announced it would be taking steps to adopt the metric as the official measure of British poverty. Their second report published in 2019 showed that 7 million people live in persistent poverty.

=== Other forms of poverty ===
Water poverty is defined by the government as spending more than 3% of disposable income on water bills. Nationally, in 2006, nearly 10% of households were in water poverty.

Fuel poverty. A fuel poor household is one that struggles to keep adequately warm at reasonable cost. The most widely accepted definition of a fuel poor household is one which needs to spend more than 10% of its income on all fuel use and to heat the home to an adequate standard of warmth. This is generally defined as 21 °C (70 °F) in the living room and 18 °C (64 °F) in the other occupied rooms. Fuel poverty affects over a million British working households and over 2.3 million households in total and increases in energy prices affect poor people severely.

=== Causes of poverty ===
- Disability – Disabled adults are twice as likely to live in low income households as non-disabled adults.
- Illness
- Mental illness
- Low intelligence – People with an IQ of 60 or below are speculated to be in danger of poverty and homelessness in the US in 2006.
- Unemployment
- Underemployment – having a low-paid job with wages lower than the living wage, often the minimum wage, and working part-time.
- Being born to poor parents
- Lack of social capital
- Cuts to social services
- Being a lone parent – half of all lone parents are on a low income.
- Racial discrimination

=== Recent figures ===
Eurostat figures show that the numbers of Britons at risk of poverty had fallen to 15.9% in 2014, down from 17.1% in 2010 and 19% in 2005 (after social transfers were taken into account).

If the poverty line is defined as those individuals and households with incomes less than 60% of their respective medians, then "nearly 60%" of those in poverty were homeowners in 2005.

=== Historical measurements of poverty ===
Seebohm Rowntree chose a basic 'shopping basket' of foods (identical to the rations given in the local workhouse), clothing and housing needs – anyone unable to afford them was deemed to be in poverty. By 1950, with the founding of the modern welfare state, the 'shopping basket' measurement had been abandoned.

== Poverty reduction ==
=== Welfare overview ===
People enter the world of poverty due to: problems at the individual/family level and problems with the economy as a whole. Problems at the individual level include: race (human categorization), gender, sexual orientation, drug use, and level of education. Problems with the economy can include: low labor participation and high levels of unemployment. Welfare is financial support given by the government to people in need. There are pressures on the welfare state because welfare must be justified in terms of its contribution to economic success. Welfare must contribute positively to the economy otherwise there is a risk of damaging currency values. Damage to currency values will damage trading positions and investment which will, in turn, hurt the economy overall.

The Department of Health and Social Security (DHSS) is responsible for the welfare services in the United Kingdom. Income maintenance is centrally administered through DHSS offices (regional and local level). Those who earn 39 pounds a week (except some married women) or more must contribute to the National Insurance Scheme. The National Health Service (NHS) provides virtually free healthcare for all residents – this is also centrally administered.

=== Persistent poverty and poverty statistics ===
Persistent poverty is the effects of experiencing low income for long periods of time. In 2014, 6.5% of the United Kingdom's population was classified as being in persistent poverty; that equates to approximately 3.9 million people. The UK's poverty rate overall in 2014 was the 12th highest amongst all European nations at 16.8%, however; it has the third-lowest persistent poverty rate. Income tends to be measured before or after housing costs are accounted for (BHC or AHC). Poverty levels tend to be higher after housing costs are accounted for because the poorer households need to spend a higher percentage of their income on housing. In 2014–2015, 13.5 million people were in relative low income AHC (an increase of 300,000 from the year before) and 12.9 million people were in absolute low income AHC (a decrease of 700,000 from the year before). Relative low income means that people live in households with income below 60% of the median in a specified year. Absolute income means that people live in households with income below 60% of the median income in some base year.

In 2016, the incomes of poor households were extremely sensitive to the activity in the labour market. When any downturn in the labor market occurs, the poorest people in the UK are increasingly more vulnerable and at greater risk. Median income (overall) has moved 2% above pre-crisis (2007–2008) levels. During the recovery period, inequality in workers' earnings has decreased. There has been strong employment growth along with weak earnings growth which have kept inequality low for several years.

=== Poverty reduction strategies ===
In 1999, Tony Blair, the former Prime Minister of the United Kingdom, pledged that child poverty in the United Kingdom will end within a generation. The goal was to completely eradicate child poverty by 2020. Poverty is a result of several different factors, some of which include a lack of education and training, low participation in the labour market, poor working conditions and affordable housing.

The key components of the UK's strategy to fight poverty are:

- To increase labour market participation of those eligible to work.
- To make work more advantageous for those receiving benefit.
- To promote financial security for families.
- To improve access to public transportation.

One of the most crucial ways to reduce poverty is to increase benefit take-up. In 2009–10 almost a third of those who were eligible for means-tested benefit did not claim. In 2011–2012, 15% of those eligible for Child Tax Credit did not claim, neither did 35% of those eligible for Working Tax Credit. Improving these numbers and getting those people to claim their entitlements would significantly help reduce poverty.

Ways that would help to increase benefit take-up include:

- Simplifying the procedure so that claimants could better understand their entitlements.
- Improvements to mental health services and support.
- Improving child welfare, thus enabling children to benefit from a quality education.

A decrease in poverty would mean a more active economy because more people would have the ability to purchase more consumer goods.

In one of the richest nations in the world there are 14 million people below the poverty line, so there are wider issues. On the whole the wealth level below the threshold can change. China have moved 800 million people out of poverty since 1978, following its lead the UK can increase the minimum wage, decrease gender wage gap, encourage income growth through profit sharing in companies, give tax refunds to lower income earners, by working closer with charities, aiming for a higher average annual income increase, decreasing inflation, allowing greater equality through education and other means of economic freedom, and cutting down on poverty on a per region basis.

== Viewpoints of major political parties ==
=== Poverty in 2015 General Election ===
For the British General Election of 2015, research was undertaken to analyse the commitment of the UK's political parties in addressing poverty. It demonstrated that "poverty has been overlooked as an issue in the General Election campaign" and that only the Green Party had an effective policy to deal with poverty. Analysis of other parties' policies and how they are used to deal with poverty ended in negative conclusions: "The Conservatives and UKIP both performed fairly badly". Labour performed better in some specific policy areas when compared to the Conservatives, but "there is not very much difference between them". Overall, the audit noted that views towards poverty were affected by specific views for those receiving social security benefits: "there was a general tendency to come down hard on welfare recipients, with a shift towards means-testing and victim-blaming across the board. This can be seen particularly in the context of Immigration and Housing."

=== Poverty and political parties in 2000s ===
==== Labour Party ====
While leader of the Labour Government, Tony Blair vowed in 1999 to cut child poverty 25% by 2005, 50% by 2010 and to eradicate child poverty completely by 2020. The Labour Party website states:

"In 1997 Labour inherited one of the highest rates of child poverty in Europe – with one in three children living in poverty. Our mission to abolish child poverty is grounded both in our determination to secure social justice, and to tackle the problems that the social exclusion of children builds up for the long-term. Work is the best route out of poverty and our successful welfare to work measures have lifted millions out of poverty including disabled people, who have too often previously been consigned to a life on benefits. At the same time, millions of families are benefiting from the Child tax credit, the Working tax credit, and record rises in Child benefit."

Their 2005 manifesto states:

"[Since the Labour government came to power in 1997] there are two million fewer children and nearly two million fewer pensioners living in absolute poverty."

==== Conservative Party ====
In late November 2006, the Conservative Party garnered headlines across the press when a senior member spoke out on poverty, invoking the name of Polly Toynbee. The headlines began when David Cameron's policy advisor and shadow minister Greg Clark wrote:

"The traditional Conservative vision of welfare as a safety net encompasses another outdated Tory nostrum – that poverty is absolute, not relative. Churchill's safety net is at the bottom: holding people at subsistence level, just above the abyss of hunger and homelessness. It is the social commentator Polly Toynbee who supplies imagery that is more appropriate for Conservative social policy in the twenty first century."

This approach generated much comment and analysis. It was followed two days later by Cameron saying poverty should be seen in relative terms to the rest of society, where people lack those things which others in society take for granted, "those who think otherwise are wrong [...] I believe that poverty is an economic waste, a moral disgrace. [...] We will only tackle the causes of poverty if we give a bigger role to society, tackling poverty is a social responsibility [...] Labour rely too heavily on redistributing money, and on the large, clunking mechanisms of the state."

== Pressure/interest groups ==
The Joseph Rowntree Foundation is one of the largest social policy research and development charities in the UK and takes particular interest in the issue of poverty, with over 2,000 reports on poverty and disadvantage available on its website.

The Child Poverty Action Group campaigns for the elimination of poverty amongst children.

End Child Poverty coalition also seeks the eradication of child poverty.

The Oxfam UK Poverty Programme works with people and policy makers to tackle the causes of poverty.

In July 2013, Freedom from Torture published its report "The Poverty Barrier: The Right to Rehabilitation for Survivors of Torture in the UK which highlighted failings of the British asylum system in their handling of torture survivors arriving in the UK. The evidence included in the report came from the testimony of over 100 survivors of torture and eighteen members of Freedom from Torture's clinical department. The report highlighted financial insecurity, social exclusion and hopelessness and how poverty prevented the rehabilitation process.

The Edinburgh Coalition Against Poverty is a solidarity organisation in Scotland with a particular focus on helping unemployed and disabled people to avoid and out of poverty.

== See also ==
- 2021–present United Kingdom cost-of-living crisis
- Environmental inequality in the United Kingdom
- Health inequality in the United Kingdom
- Homelessness in the United Kingdom
- Hunger in the United Kingdom
- Income in the United Kingdom
- Levelling-up policy of the Conservative government
- List of countries by percentage of population living in poverty
- Suicide in the United Kingdom
- 2021–present United Kingdom cost-of-living crisis
- United Kingdom government austerity programme
- Universal basic income in the United Kingdom

== Bibliography ==
- Brundage, Anthony. The making of the new Poor law : the politics of inquiry, enactment, and implementation, 1832-1839 [Rutgers University Press, 1978) online
- Chadwick, W. Edward. The church, the state, and the poor: a series of historical sketches (Robert Scott, 1914) online
- Charlton, John, ed. The health of adult Britain, 1841-1994 (1997) online v1
- Coates, Ken, and Richard Silburn. Poverty, the forgotten Englishmen (Penguin, 1981) online
- Coats, A.W. ed. Poverty in the Victorian age; debates on the issue from 19th century critical journals (4 vol. Gregg, 1973) online
- Driver, Felix. Power and pauperism : the workhouse system, 1834-1884 (2004)
- Glendinning, Caroline, and Jane Miller, eds. Women and Poverty in Britain (Wheatsheaf,, 1987) online
- Himmelfarb, Gertrude. The idea of poverty : England in the early Industrial Age (1984) online
- Murray, Peter. Poverty and welfare, 1830-1914 (Hodder & Stoughton, 1999) online
- Rees, Rosemary et al. Poverty and public health 1815–1948 (Heinemann, 2001). online, Broad ranging history designed as undergraduate textbook.
- Rose, Michael E. The relief of poverty, 1834-1914 (1986)
- Rowntree, B. Seebohm. Poverty: A Study Of Town Life (1902) online
- Rowntree B. Seebohm. Poverty And Progress: A second social survey of York. (1942) online
- Simmons, Michael. Landscapes - of poverty : aspects of rural England in the late 1990s (1997) online
- Smith, George Davey et al. eds. Poverty, inequality and health in Britain: 1800-2000: A reader (Polity, 2001)
- Smith, N. J. Poverty in England, 1601-1936 (1972) onlline
- Smith, Noel, and Sue Middleton. "A review of poverty dynamics research in the UK." (Loughborough University, 2007). online
- Wood, Peter. Poverty and the workhouse in Victorian Britain (Alan Sutton, 1991) online

== Key sources and external links ==
=== Government statistics ===
- The UK Government's Department for Work and Pensions makes a yearly collection of Households below average income (HBAI) statistics, and has been doing so since 1994–5. The report for 2014-5 includes data and summary the overall income distribution, income equality, sources of income, low income indicators, and data on the relationship between poverty and children, age, pensioners and disability. The Department for Work and Pensions (official site) is responsible for policy relating to social welfare and tends to take the lead in addressing or contributing to poverty

Government reports

- "Measuring Child Poverty" (PDF). Department for Work and Pensions. December 2003. Archived from the original (PDF) on 6 June 2014.
- "Understanding older people's experiences of poverty and material deprivation" (PDF). DWP. July 2006. Archived from the original (PDF) on 5 June 2009.

=== Other sources of reports and analysis ===
- UK Poverty 2017, The Joseph Rowntree Foundation - This report examines poverty rates in the UK, and looks at how figures have changed over the past two decades.
- One hundred years of poverty and policy by Howard Glennerster, John Hills, and David Piachaud and Jo Webb - The Joseph Rowntree Foundation. Contains information on historical trends in poverty and anti-poverty legislation

Government debates (most recent first)

- Child poverty debate - Westminster Hall, 4 July 2006.
- Poverty debate - House of Lords, 6 February 2002.
- Student poverty debate - House of Lords, 15 March 2001.

Child poverty

- Child poverty, The Joseph Rowntree Foundation
- Number and percentage of children living in poverty, in each year, 1979-2004.
- Number and percentage of children living in poverty, in each year, 1979-2004 before and after housing costs.
- Percentage of children living in poverty in working or workless households, 2003-04.
- Proportion of children in families with (a) a lone parent, (b) married parents or stepparents and (c) cohabiting parents or stepparents in poverty, 2004-05.
- Number and percentage of children living in poverty, 1997-2004.
- Northern Ireland: children living in the province estimated to be living in poverty, broken down by (a) Northern Ireland local government district and (b) parliamentary constituency, 2002/04.

Working-age poverty

- Working-age poverty, The Joseph Rowntree Foundation

Pensioner poverty

- Pensioner poverty, Joseph Rowntree Foundation
- Number and percentage of pensioners living in poverty from 1979-2004.
- Pensioners in poverty 1994-2003, broken down by region.

Rural poverty

- Rural poverty, 2002.

Mixed

- Percentage of children and adults living in poverty both before and after housing costs from 1995-2005.
- Poverty among (a) pensioners, (b) the unemployed, (c) disabled and (d) others in 1996/97 and 2003/04.

Miscellaneous

- JRF's What is poverty? page
- The average weekly income for a) the lowest earning 40% and b) the highest earning 40% in England as a whole and the South West in particular for 1996/97-1998/99 and 2002/03-2004/05.
- Contains estimates on trends in poverty and inequality in the United Kingdom from 1960 onwards
- Contains estimates on trends in poverty and inequality in the United Kingdom from 1961 onwards
- Contains estimates on the proportion of the population living in poverty from 1961 to 1995

=== General news items ===
- Breadline Britain - the welfare state 60 years on - BBC News, 2006.
- Social Exclusion - The Guardian, updated regularly.
- Smoking Poverty in the UK - Shout Out UK, 2019
- Poverty in Britain - Why are millions of Brits so broke? Deutsche Welle, 2023.

=== Historical ===
- Charles Bradlaugh (1870s), Why do men starve?, London: Austin & Co., Wikidata Q26395493
- Charles Bradlaugh (1870s), Poverty: its effects on the political condition of the people, London: Austin & Co., Wikidata Q26720834
