= Church Action on Poverty =

UK-based Christian charity

Church Action on Poverty is a UK-based national ecumenical Christian social justice charity, committed to tackling poverty in the United Kingdom. Church Action on Poverty works in partnership with churches and with people in poverty themselves to find solutions to poverty, locally, nationally and globally.

== History ==
Church Action on Poverty was formed in 1982, has its main offices in Manchester and is charity number 1079986. The first director of CAP was the MP John Battle, the second Director was former government minister Paul Goggins. The current director is Niall Cooper.

== Philosophy ==
Church Action on Poverty emphasises the need for people in poverty to have a voice in decisions which affect them, and focuses on participation and empowerment. An example of this approach is their 'poverty hearing' model.

== Campaigns ==
Church Action on Poverty currently runs campaigns which are connected by the theme 'Close the Gap', aiming to tackle economic inequality and close the gap between rich and poor. The organisation has successfully campaigned for all the UK's major Christian denominations to support the Living Wage.

Previously, Church Action on Poverty ran the Living Ghosts campaign highlighting the destitution of asylum seekers in the UK. It also helped to set up and run the Debt on our Doorstep campaign against loan sharks and extortionate lending practices such as payday loans.

Church Action on Poverty has pioneered the use of international development approaches to tackle UK poverty. Examples include participatory budgeting (which was taken up by the Labour government in 2007), sustainable livelihoods analysis, and Freirean popular education in the form of 'Schools of Participation'.

=== People's Budget ===
The People's Budget is a campaign for more participatory budgeting in UK led by the Church Action on Poverty who planned campaign workshops across the UK in London, St. Helens, Merseyside, Dudley, Tameside, Leeds and Tyneside.

The Church Action on Poverty feels that billions of pounds of money is being used by public bodies without any involvement of local people. 'The People's Budget' campaign is about helping British citizens understand how to influence their local council, health organisation, police force or housing provider. The campaign works with groups and individual to promote:

1. Participatory budgeting in their local area and wider
2. Participatory budgeting as the standard model for certain budgets
3. Having a one percent minimum of public sector budgets decided using participatory budgeting

== External resources ==
- Church Action on Poverty website
