= Trust for London =

UK independent charitable foundation

- Formation: 1891; 135 years ago
- Registration no.: 205629
- Headquarters: Fourth Floor, 4 Chiswell Street, London, EC1Y 4UP
- Location: London, United Kingdom
- Coordinates: 51.52077654438826°N 0.0877563608529201°W
- Revenue: £11.4 million GBP (2023)
- Expenses: £23 million GBP (2023)
- Staff: 29 (2023)
- Website: trustforlondon.org.uk
- Formerly called: City Parochial Foundation

Trust for London is an independent charitable foundation which aims to tackle poverty and inequality in London and its root causes. It was established in 1891 as the City Parochial Foundation and changed its name to Trust for London in 2010.

It achieves its aims by funding charitable work through its Central Fund, making substantial grants every year for the relief of poverty and inequality. As an independent funder it is particularly interested in work which is viewed as challenging. One of its long standing principles is to support activities which government will not or is unlikely to fund.

== History ==
City of London Parochial Charities Act 1883 (Note: Section 1.)
- Act of Parliament
- Parliament of the United Kingdom
- Long title: An Act to provide for the better application and management of the Parochial Charities of the City of London.
- Citation: 46 & 47 Vict. c. 36
- Territorial extent: United Kingdom

Dates
- Royal assent: 20 August 1883
- Commencement: 20 August 1883 (Note: The Acts of Parliament (Commencement) Act 1793.)
- Repealed: 25 July 1898
Other legislation
Repealed by	Statute Law Revision Act 1898

Status: Repealed

Text of statute as originally enacted

On 10 August 1878 a royal commission was established to investigate the parochial charities. It reported on 12 March 1880, which led to the City of London Parochial Charities Act 1883 (46 & 47 Vict. c. 36). This provided that the five largest parishes should continue to administer their own charitable endowments, but that the charities of the remaining 107 parishes (consisting of about 1,400 separate charitable gifts and bequests stretching back over 400 years) should be administered by a new corporate body officially called the Trustees of the London Parochial Charities. For most of its history it was known as City Parochial Foundation but since 2010 has been known as Trust for London.

A central governing body (CGB) was established for the trustees, consisting of 21 members, nominated by the Crown, the Corporation of the City of London, the London County Council, the Ecclesiastical Commissioners, the senate of the University of London, the councils of University College, London and King's College, London, the council of the City and Guilds of London Institute, and the governing bodies of the Bishopsgate Foundation and the Cripplegate Foundation. There are now 17 members, mostly now nominated by the trust itself, although some members are still nominated by London councils, the Greater London Authority, the Church Commissioners, and the Corporation of the City of London.

The trust assumed trusteeship of the City Church Fund, which held the ecclesiastical endowments. In 1899, it also assumed trusteeship of the Chelsea Physic Garden, which it held until 1983. In 1933, it also took over the People's Palace and Four Boroughs' Fund, in 1957 the new Sion Hospital (London) Charity, in 1966 the Whitley House Charity, and in 1982 the Ratcliff Fund.
