= Joseph Rowntree Foundation =

British social change organisation

- Abbreviation: JRF
- Formation: 1904; 122 years ago
- Founder: Joseph Rowntree
- Type: Charity
- Headquarters: York
- Location: United Kingdom
- Official language: English
- Group Chief Executive: Julian Hartley
- Website: jrf.org.uk

The Joseph Rowntree Foundation (JRF) is a charity that conducts and funds research aimed at solving poverty in the UK. JRF's stated aim is to "inspire action and change that will create a prosperous UK without poverty."

Originally called the Joseph Rowntree Village Trust, it was founded by English businessman Joseph Rowntree in 1904. Rowntree, a Quaker, was a long-standing philanthropist and with his brother developed a confectionery company, Rowntree's. He established the foundation in order to investigate the root causes of social problems. In its current form, the foundation works with private, public and voluntary sectors, as well as impoverished people. It is politically neutral and independent from all UK political parties.

== History ==
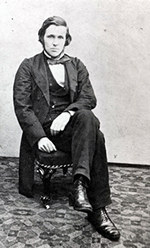
Joseph Rowntree in 1862

JRF was established in 1904 by Joseph Rowntree to understand the root causes of social problems. Joseph was a visionary Quaker businessman and social reformer. Watching his father set up a York soup kitchen in the mid-1800s helped Joseph to realise that such actions were not comprehensive enough. This led to a shift in the Rowntrees' social action, from treating the symptoms to addressing the root causes of poverty. Joseph gave away half of his own fortune to set up various trusts; he was committed to understanding the causes of poverty and disadvantage in order to create a better society. He built New Earswick, a village in York, for people on low incomes, giving them access to decent homes at affordable rents.

Joseph's son, Seebohm Rowntree, was also a pioneering social researcher who undertook one of the country's first investigations into poverty. Poverty, A Study of Town Life (1901) influenced the Liberal Government's introduction of Old Age Pensions (1908) and National Insurance (1911) as a means of protecting people from insecurity. His further studies of York (in 1936 and 1951) demonstrated the increasing effectiveness of welfare measures in anchoring the citizens of York in times of hardship. Seebohm Rowntree's surveys were pivotal in a line of intellectual thinking that ended with Beveridge's Welfare State. In addition his book, The Human Factor in Business (1921), set a standard for various workplace provisions; from pension schemes and industrial regulations to employee education and work's councils. Such progressive measures led to him becoming an advisor to the Liberal PM David Lloyd George during the First World War. Seebohm helped to design welfare boards in the new state-owned munitions factories.

Both Joseph and Seebohm Rowntree had a clear vision about how to improve people's lives. Joseph outlined these ideas in his 'Founder's Memorandum', a blueprint for his early charitable work. Although it was written in 1904, many of its aims remain at the heart of JRF's mission today: carrying out social research, and working to influence society and policy through robust evidence and communication.

== Current work ==
Areas of work cover:

- Cities, towns and neighbourhoods
- Housing
- Income and benefits
- People
- Society
- Work

In February 2020, figures from the Joseph Rowntree Foundation showed that the proportion of people living in poverty in the United Kingdom who are in a working family is at a record high: the proportion was 56% in 2018, up from 39% twenty years earlier in 1998.

== See also ==
- Derwenthorpe
- Poverty in the United Kingdom
- Centre for Research in Social Policy
