= Fuel poverty in the United Kingdom =

UK policy around domestic heating

Fuel poverty in the United Kingdom is defined differently in different countries of the UK. In England, a household is considered to be in fuel poverty if they are living in a property with an energy efficiency rating of band D or below and, if after heating their home to an adequate level, they fall below the official poverty line. In Northern Ireland, Scotland, and Wales, the definition of fuel poverty is whether a household needs to spend more than 10% of their income on energy bills to heat their home to an adequate level of warmth. To be considered adequate, the main living room needs to be 21 °C (70 °F), and other occupied rooms 18 °C (64 °F) during the daytime, with lower temperatures allowed at night.

== Definition history ==
In England the definition of fuel poverty was redefined in 2014, and is now measured using the Low Income Low Energy Efficiency (LILEE) indicator. A household is considered to be fuel poor if they are living in a property with an energy efficiency rating of band D or below, and after heating their home to an adequate level, they are below the official poverty line. The official poverty line is considered to be a residual income 60% below the median household income after housing costs. Adequate warmth is considered to be 21 °C (70 °F) in the main living room and 18 °C (64 °F) in other occupied rooms during daytime hours, with lower temperatures at night, following the recommendations of the World Health Organization.

In January 2014, the UK Cameron-Clegg coalition government redefined fuel poverty to only include households if they were below the official poverty line and spent more than average on energy. This redefinition lifted 6% of UK households out of fuel poverty, and was criticised at the time by the cross-party Commons environmental audit committee for moving the goal posts instead of alleviating the problem.

Previously, and still used in Northern Ireland, Scotland and Wales, the definition of fuel poverty was based on whether a household needed to spend more than 10% of their income on energy bills to heat their home to an adequate level of warmth.

The previous definition of fuel poverty is essentially that first established by Brenda Boardman in her book entitled Fuel Poverty, first published in 1991, although fuel poverty has been the focus of political action since the early 1970s.

The redefinition of fuel poverty in the UK came after the Secretary of State for Energy and Climate Change announced on 14 March 2011 that he had asked Professor John Hills of the London School of Economics to lead a review of the fuel poverty definition and target. The interim report of this independent review was published on 19 October 2011. On page 19 of the interim report, Hill suggests redefining a fuel-poor household as one that has required fuel costs that are above the median level, and were they to spend that amount, would be left with a residual income below the official poverty line. This new definition has been in use since January 2014.

== Households in fuel poverty ==
In early 2008 it was estimated by Energywatch that there were around 4.4 million households in fuel poverty in the UK, with just over 3 million in England alone. This was more than double the number in 2003.

2008 saw significant price increases of approximately 45% by energy companies on gas and electric. In early 2009 the companies declared they were to drop their prices, but only a 10% reduction was seen across the board and this did not happen, with the exception of British Gas, until 31 March, once the worst of the winter was over. Research from NEA showed that as of March 2009 over 5 million households across the UK were living in fuel poverty.

In April 2011 a YouGov survey indicated that the number of households in fuel poverty had risen to 6.3 million households, representing approximately 24% of all households in the UK.

The UK Government's 2015 Fuel Poverty Report showed that 4.5 million households, or 17% of UK households, were in fuel poverty.

A survey of families on Universal Credit and Child Tax Credit in October 2020 found that 26% are already cutting back on heating and electricity. The survey further found that 60% had gone into debt, and families borrowed over £1,700 in the last two months alone. The COVID-19 pandemic had caused 38% of families worse off than before.

According to the Department for Business, Energy & Industrial Strategy, as of 2020 13.2% of households (3.16 million) in England were in fuel poverty. However, due to the energy crisis seen in the UK in 2021 and 2022, the number of households in fuel poverty has doubled as of April 2022 according to the End Fuel Poverty Coalition, and is expected to rise to 8.5 million by the end of 2022. According to a University of York press release on 8 August 2022, a report by York academics predicted that over three-quarters of UK households, or 53 million people, will be in fuel poverty by January 2023. The York report was written before the government announced a raft of measures on top of the £400 to be deducted from everyone's energy bill, including payments of £650 to more than 8 million low-income households, and £900 payments more for some groups from April 2023, £300 for pensioner households and £150 for people on certain disability benefits, designed to help with fuel costs.

== Excess winter deaths ==
Excess winter deaths are defined by the Office for National Statistics as the difference between the number of deaths during the four winter months (December to March) and the average number of deaths during the preceding autumn (August to November) and the following summer (April to July).

Although the phenomenon of excess winter deaths is not unique to the United Kingdom, the incidence is markedly higher than for countries with similar climates and living standards. England has an 18% rise in deaths during the winter, on average, whereas Finland has a 10% increase, Germany and the Netherlands have 11%.

Since 2000, excess winter deaths in England and Wales remained generally at around 25,000. For the period of 2007–2008 the number of excess winter deaths was 27,480 of which the Hill report estimated that around 10% were caused directly by fuel poverty. The winter of 2008–2009 was the coldest in 10 years, and the Office for National Statistics estimated there were a total of 36,700, an increase of 49% over the previous year, which represents a 23.8% rise in deaths during the winter. Lower totals in subsequent years were followed by a rise back to 31,100 excess deaths in the winter of 2012–2013, of whom 25,600 were aged 75 or older, resulting in the Conservative-Liberal Democrat coalition government being criticised for not exercising tighter control over UK energy companies.

Exposure to the cold does affect the number of winter deaths‚ but deaths from other cold related causes are very much more common than it is for the cold to kill people directly. In the main these deaths are from respiratory or cardio-vascular ailments. Overall deaths are from heart attacks‚ strokes‚ bronchial and other conditions‚ and may often occur several days after exposure to the cold. Spending too long in the cold will lower the body temperature which can often aggravate circulatory diseases‚ which can lead to strokes and heart attacks or respiratory illnesses such as bronchitis or pneumonia.

Under the Climate Change and Sustainable Energy Act 2006 the Government is obliged to report annual progress in cutting the number of households in which one or more persons are living in fuel poverty.

=== Opinions of charities ===
Sharp rises in fuel prices could lead to more excess deaths because vulnerable households cannot afford sufficient heating. Simon Francis of the 'End Fuel Poverty Coalition' said in December 2022 that people must choose "between heating and dying". Francis said that if people have no heating, they will need the NHS or worse. Age UK stated there was an increase in the number of desperate calls to its help line. Caroline Abrahams of Age UK said that energy prices would lead to almost a third of older households, roughly 3 million homes getting into fuel poverty. Age UK fear more people will die due to cold. Abrahams urged the government to make sure vulnerable older people are confident about turning on their heating.

Peter Smith of National Energy Action stated in December 2022 that people were contacting them desperately worried about staying warm. Despite freezing weather many people were frightened to turn heating on because they do not want to get further into debt despite a risk to their physical or mental health. Smith also said: "The government must ensure everyone can access the support they are entitled to." Matt Richards of the fairness campaign 38 Degrees said in December 2022 that people were struggling to survive this winter, some could afford neither heating nor eating. Erika Radford, of 'Asthma + Lung UK' stated winter is life threatening for people with lung illnesses and the organisation does not want "more people being rushed to hospital fighting for breath" due to cold. They want the government to give targeted support to people with lung conditions.

== Action programmes ==
The UK's main programme targeting fuel poverty is the Energy Company Obligation.

The Home Heat Helpline was available during 2005 – 2016 to provide assistance to vulnerable groups and responded to 400,000 telephone calls. It provided information about:

- Advice on social tariffs – typically a 20% saving
- Access to the Priority Services Register, with free annual gas appliance safety checks, passwords for official gas and electricity-related callers. Third party, Braille, large print and talking billing
- Grants for free home insulation regardless of who owns the property and no means testing for the over 70s. Absolute right for them to receive free cavity wall and loft insulation or free top-ups to modern standards. Same help to all households in receipt of Attendance Allowance, Disability Living Allowance or Employment and Support Allowance (Incapacity Benefit), Single Parent Allowance or households with young children with an annual income of less than £14,600.
- Flexible payment options for customers in fuel debt
- A disconnection safety net, ensuring that no vulnerable customer will be knowingly disconnected.

== Parliamentary inquiry ==
The UK Parliamentary Select Committee on Energy and Climate Change recently launched an inquiry on home energy efficiency in September 2015.

== See also ==
- 2021–present United Kingdom cost-of-living crisis
- Poverty
- Poverty in the United Kingdom
- Energy in the United Kingdom
- Energy efficiency in British housing
- Committee on Fuel Poverty
- Don't Pay UK
