= Great British Insulation Scheme =

UK government energy efficiency scheme

The Great British Insulation Scheme (GBIS) was an initiative launched by the UK government to enhance efficient energy use in residential properties. The scheme initially consulted on by the Department for Energy Security and Net Zero labelled as ECO+, reflects the UK's efforts towards environmental sustainability and the reduction of household energy costs.

The GBIS programme sets clear goals for medium and large energy suppliers in the UK. Their mission is to help households reduce their energy bills by implementing specific insulation measures of Energy efficiency in British housing. This not only aids in cutting down costs but also plays a significant role in reducing the carbon footprint of homes across Great Britain.

The scheme's timeline began on 25 July 2023 and concluded in October 2025 (to new applicants). The responsibility of overseeing its operations and ensuring compliance with its guidelines is entrusted to Ofgem, the primary energy regulatory authority in the UK.

== Background ==
"Energy poverty occurs when household bills cost so much that, once paid, a household’s leftover income is below the official poverty line. At one point in 2022, it was estimated that rising energy prices would push over 8 million people into energy poverty. In the UK, energy poverty has particular geographies. It is intricately linked to the vulnerability of particular social groups, such as the elderly or those with disabilities or chronic health issues."

The scheme is a response to the need for energy efficiency in the UK, building on the legacy of similar initiatives like the Energy Company Obligation (ECO), Carbon Emission Reduction Target (CERT), and Community Energy Saving Programme (CESP).

It addresses several government objectives, including reducing energy demand to secure the UK’s energy independence. The residential sector accounted for around 31% of the UK's final energy consumption in 2021.

== Objectives of the scheme ==
The primary goal is to deliver greater energy efficiency for hundreds of thousands of households through insulation, aligning with the UK's Net Zero ambitions.

It aims to help households maintain warmer homes, reduce their energy bills, and cut carbon emissions.

Group 1 – General Group:

1. Must be living in a home in council tax bands A-D in England and A-E in Wales and Scotland
2. Property must have an Energy Performance Certificate (EPC) of D and below
3. If eligible, house owner may receive a single insulation measure
4. A contribution may be required towards the insulation

Group 2 – Low-Income Eligibility Group:

1. Must be receiving certain means-tested benefits
2. Property must have an Energy Performance Certificate (EPC) of D and below
3. If eligible, one may receive a single insulation measure – plus the possibility of heating controls

The scheme continues the focus of ECO4 on enhancing the energy efficiency of the least energy-efficient homes, but is predominantly a single measure scheme focusing on insulation.

== Key features ==
The scheme promotes various insulation measures, including:

- cavity wall insulation
- flat or pitched roof insulation
- loft insulation
- solid wall insulation (internal or external)
- park home insulation
- room-in-roof insulation
- solid floor insulation
- underfloor insulation

It will run alongside the existing Energy Company Obligation (ECO4) scheme.

The scheme utilises established ECO supply chains, ensuring that the appropriate measures are selected and correctly installed.

== Implementation ==
Approximately 2,000 installers per year are expected to deliver the scheme in its final two years across Great Britain.

The scheme broadens the eligibility criteria from ECO4 by introducing two eligibility groups, with the low-income group being for those referred by local authorities or energy suppliers.

== Funding and budget ==
The Great British Insulation Scheme has been allocated a substantial budget to ensure its effective implementation and to achieve its objectives:

Overall Budget: The scheme has a total budget of £1 billion over its three-year duration, adjusted for inflation to equate to 2022 prices. This ensures that the scheme's financial resources are in line with its ambitious goals.

Annual Budgets: The budget is distributed annually over the three phases of the scheme:

- Phase A: Commencing from the start of the ECO4A order on 25 July 2023 and concluding on 31 March 2024.
- Phase B: Spanning from 1 April 2024 to 31 March 2025.
- Phase C: Starting on 1 April 2025 and ending on 31 March 2026.

Household Contributions: In addition to the government's allocation, there's an expectation of household contributions towards the scheme. The exact contribution is a matter for the customer and installer to agree upon, linked to the specific work to be done.

Administrative Costs: Based on historical data from the Household Energy Efficiency Statistics of March 2023, administrative costs have been observed to account for approximately 5.9% of the total costs. This percentage has been applied to the £1.08 billion overall spend under the GBIS, which includes £80 million of household contributions.

Utilisation of Funds: The scheme's budget will be utilised to promote energy efficiency measures, support households in reducing their energy bills, and contribute to the UK's Net Zero ambitions. This includes the installation of insulation, renewable energy sources, and the upgrade of inefficient heating systems.

== Impact and outcomes ==
The scheme is expected to treat 315,000 homes, with around 17% of these homes being in fuel poverty.

Households benefiting from the scheme are expected to see an average reduction in their energy bills by around, £300-400 per year.

The scheme aims to achieve non-traded greenhouse gas emissions savings of 0.65 MtCO_{2}e (Million Tonnes of carbon dioxide equivalent).

== Criticisms and controversies ==
The most pronounced criticism of the Great British Insulation Scheme, ECO4, and other government insulation initiatives is the marked reduction in implementation. The number of insulated homes plummeted from assisting half a million homes in 2013 to a mere 60,000 in 2022.

The Great British Insulation Scheme has faced criticism, from the Local Government Association (LGA) and local councils. The reduction in installations within last decade has cost households £2 billion in potential savings. There are fears that 2.4 million fuel-poor homes will be unsupported by 2030, delaying insulation goals and the net zero target. The LGA recommends devolving energy schemes to councils for a targeted approach.

The National Energy Action (NEA) charity expressed concerns about the scheme's pace and targeting and emphasised the scheme's misalignment with fuel-poor households' needs. ″While in recent years the UK Government has made some steady progress to expanding state funding for increasing the energy efficiency of fuel poor households, a big funding gap still exists, and throughout the crisis there has only been one policy introduced to try and reduce energy demand (ECO+)...″

According to the March 2023 report ″Infrastructure Progress Review 2023″ by the National Infrastructure Commission, the government's energy efficiency schemes are underperforming, with installations needing a significant boost to meet the EPC C target by 2035.

Protesters from the group Insulate Britain demand that the government improve the insulation of all social housing in the UK by 2025 and retrofit all homes with improved insulation by 2030.

In its ″Cost of NOT zero in 2022″ report, the non-profit organisation Energy and Climate Intelligence Unit stated, ″The UK was on an upward trajectory with home insulation until 2013 when government support schemes were cut. Since then, insulation rates have been 90% lower. Britain has the least efficient homes in western Europe.″

== Comparison with similar schemes ==
The Great British Insulation Scheme builds upon the legacy of previous initiatives:

Energy Company Obligation (ECO): In its 4th iteration, ECO4, the scheme emphasises improving the energy efficiency of the most energy-deficient homes. Yet, it distinguishes itself as a scheme that primarily targets multiple measures for low-income households.

Carbon Emission Reduction Target (CERT) was a UK government scheme that ran from 2008 to 2012. It obligated certain suppliers to make savings on carbon emissions in households, primarily through the promotion of energy efficiency improvements, such as insulation and energy-efficient lighting.

Community Energy Saving Programme (CESP) ran from 2009 to 2012 targeting specific low-income areas in the UK. It obligated larger energy suppliers, electricity generators, and electricity distributors to deliver energy-saving measures to domestic consumers in these areas.

While both CERT and CESP aimed at promoting energy efficiency and reducing carbon emissions, CESP was specifically designed to target low-income areas and address fuel poverty.
