= Brenda Boardman =

British academic and policy campaigner

Brenda Boardman MBE
- Born: 1943 (age 82–83)
- Citizenship: British
- Education: Open University, University of Sussex
- Known for: Fuel poverty policy
- Spouse: John Boardman
- Children: 2
- Awards: MBE (1998); Melchett Medal (1998); BBC Radio 4 Woman's Hour Power list (2020)
- Scientific career
- Workplaces: University of Sussex, St Hilda's College (University of Oxford)
- Thesis: Economic, Social and Technical Considerations for Fuel Poverty Policy
- Academic advisors: John Chesshire & Gordon MacKerron

Brenda Boardman MBE (born 1943) is a research fellow at University of Oxford and a campaigner against fuel poverty. She provided the evidence and theory base for measuring the energy inefficiency of houses, coined the term 'affordable warmth' and has influenced UK government policy in this area.

== Career ==
The overall focus of Boardman's research can be described as how to reduce demand for energy across the UK economy, and particularly the built environment, through using more energy-efficient homes and appliances.

After leaving school, Boardman travelled around the world for two and a half years. This experience had a profound effect on the subsequent course of her life. She worked for the Society for Cooperative Dwellings between 1973 and 1976 which gave her experience of house building and its funding. She started an Open University degree in 1974 concentrating on sociology and technology and graduated with a first-class degree. She was subsequently employed at the Science Policy Research Unit at the University of Sussex. She started her doctoral research in 1983, completing it in 1988 and thereafter worked as a consultant from home through her network of contacts until 1991. Her research brought together information from physics, building engineering, human physiology, economics and sociology for a novel broad view of fuel poverty. The major conclusion was that energy-inefficient housing stock was the fundamental reason for fuel poverty.

In 1984, Boardman was the author of The Cost of Warmth, a discussion paper from the National Right to Fuel Campaign. It included a Cost of Warmth Index equation that included factors to account for individual homes and personal circumstances. This showed that the cost of maintaining one warm room in an energy inefficient house could be four times that of heating an entire energy-efficient house. The discussion paper reported that although the UK government spent £1.4 billion as subsidy for heating the poorest UK households, only £20 million was allocated to improvements to buildings that would have improved heating efficiency and given long-term cost savings. The index was included in UK government discussion on policy to support low-income households. Since then, UK government policy has developed and made progress with the issues around fuel poverty.

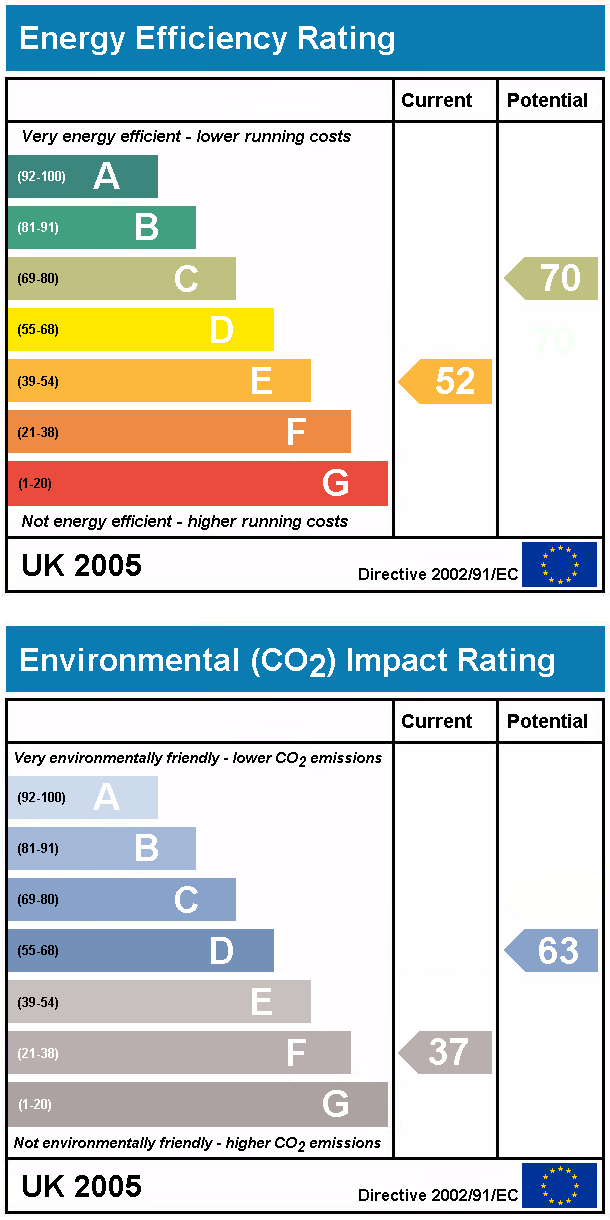
UK Home Performance Rating Charts

Boardman was especially interested in fuel poverty and how energy is used in low-income homes. She developed the first technical definition of fuel poverty during her doctoral research and it was presented in 1991 in her book Fuel Poverty: From Cold Homes to Affordable Warmth. It involved the ratio of energy cost to household income to achieve a satisfactory household heating regime, which she termed 'affordable warmth'. This equation was used by the UK government to inform policy for over 20 years until revised by the Hills Review for use in England, although it continued to be used by governments in Wales, Scotland and Northern Ireland for at least another decade.

Boardman also discussed a link between global warming and fuel poverty in her book as a further reason for needing to have energy-efficient homes. Cold houses use energy inefficiently and thus cause unnecessary carbon dioxide emissions. This link continued to be another theme in her work.

Boardman has worked at the University of Oxford since 1991. She was initially employed in a post on energy efficiency funded by Powergen in the university's new Environmental Change Unit and also appointed as a senior research fellow at St Hilda's College. In 1993 she began the first of several DECADE (Domestic Equipment and Carbon Dioxide Emissions]) projects funded by industry, the UK government and the European Commission, developing a model for energy use by the UK's domestic appliances. The outcomes were adopted into UK government policy and have been developed further subsequently. The energy efficiency labelling on UK appliances is one of the outcomes. For some time her research, therefore, moved away from fuel poverty and into the efficiency of appliances. She eventually became head of the Lower Carbon Futures team and a co-director of the UK Energy Research Centre in the Environmental Change Institute of the University of Oxford. She retired in 2008 but continues as an Emeritus Research Fellow.

In parallel with her academic career, Boardman has led campaigns related to fuel poverty. From 1987 to 1991 she chaired the National Right to Fuel Campaign, having been a member since 1984.

She was a trustee of the Chesshire–Lehmann fund that between 2010 and 2016 supported research or evaluation into the relationship between fuel poverty and energy efficiency.

Boardman is a visiting professor at the University of Exeter. In 2021, she was the guest in an episode of The Life Scientific on BBC Radio 4.

== Publications ==
Books, reports, scientific articles and pamphlets that Boardman has authored or co-authored include:

- Brenda Boardman (2010) Fixing Fuel Poverty: Challenges and solutions. Routledge, 272 pp, ISBN 9781844077441
- Brenda Boardman (1991) Fuel Poverty: From Cold Homes to Affordable Warmth. Belhaven Press, 267 pp
- Robert C. Armstrong, Catherine Wolfram, Krijn P. de Jong, Robert Gross, Nathan S. Lewis, Brenda Boardman, Arthur J. Ragauskas, Karen Ehrhardt-Martinez, George Crabtree & M. V. Ramana (2016). The frontiers of energy. Nature Energy, 1:15020
- G. Milne & B. Boardman (2000). Making cold homes warmer: the effect of energy efficiency improvements in low-income homes. Energy Policy, 28:411–424

== Awards ==
- In 1998, she was awarded an MBE for her work on energy efficiency.
- In 1998, Boardman was awarded the Melchett Medal by the Energy Institute for outstanding contributions to the science of fuel and energy.
- In November 2020 she was included in the BBC Radio 4 Woman's Hour Power list 2020.

== Personal life ==
Boardman was not able to go to university immediately after she left school because of a misunderstanding about the date of one A-level examination, resulting in her not taking it. Instead, she took a secretarial course. This enabled her to work while she travelled around the world in the 1960s. She married John Boardman and they had two children. They lived in Lewes from the mid-1970s but the family moved to Oxford in 1991 once she was employed at University of Oxford.
