= Don't Pay UK =

2022–2023 British grassroots campaign

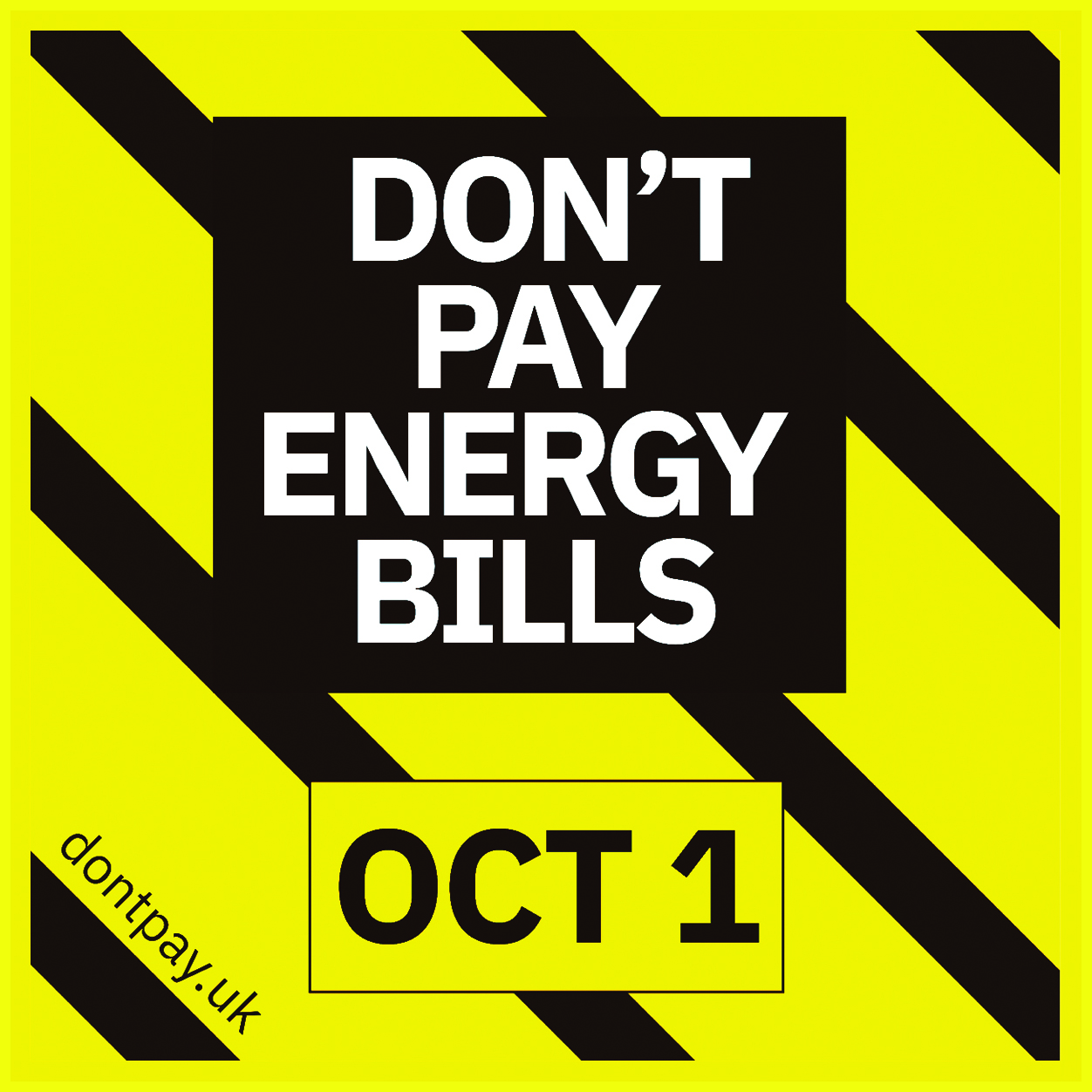
- Formation: June 2022
- Dissolved: January 2023
- Type: Advocacy group
- Region served: United Kingdom
- Website: dontpay.uk

Don't Pay UK was a grassroots direct action campaign in the United Kingdom that urge collective non-payment of energy bills. They planned to begin non-payment on 1 October 2022, when regulator Ofgem's price cap was set to rise, if one million individuals had signed up. On this date, 200,000 individuals had pledged non-payment, and Prime Minister Liz Truss had set a lower price cap than projected, so the strike did not go ahead. On 1 December 2022, the group encouraged non-payment to begin.

The group was founded by 15–20 activists in June 2022. They draw inspiration from the anti-poll tax movement, in which 17 million people declined to pay the poll tax introduced by Margaret Thatcher, causing its removal. They aimed for local groups to raise awareness of the pledge through leaflets. The government said that the pledge would lead to faster energy price increases and lower participants' credit scores.

The pledge arose in the context of large energy cap rises in the UK by the regulator Ofgem. In April 2022, the cap increased by £693 per year; at that price, 6.5 million people were unable to fully heat their homes. The following increase, on 1 October 2022, was set so energy bills would average £2,500 per year. The UK Government's position is that price increases were unavoidable due to global factors like the 2022 Russian invasion of Ukraine; it asserted eight million vulnerable households were to be given £1,200 of support. The campaign was only active for the winter of 2022-23; the following year the site was replaced with a message confirming this.

== Background ==
In April 2022, the British energy regulator Ofgem increased the energy cap—the maximum amount that a "typical" household can be charged for gas or electricity—by £693 per year. By this point, 6.5 million people were unable to heat their homes sufficiently. Ofgem was set, when Don't Pay UK started, to raise the cap by an additional £1,800 per year on 1 October 2022. Bills would then be expected to average £3,800 per year by 2023. This increase was estimated by the End Fuel Poverty Coalition to leave another 2 million people unable to afford adequate heating.

The number of people speaking to Citizens Advice who were unable to afford pre-paid energy meters was three times larger in July 2022 than in July 2021, and one million people were in arrears for electric or gas payments. A professor at the University of Liverpool, Stuart Wilks-Heeg, commented in August 2022 that "almost everybody will be in fuel poverty" under the threshold in use: a household pays more than 10% of its income on energy. Sherelle Jacobs of The Daily Telegraph commented that middle class families and pensioners could be unable to pay increased energy bills. A windfall tax on these profits was announced in July 2022. However, energy bills are a large contributing factor to the cost of living crisis (what campaigners referred to as a "cost of greed crisis").

Meanwhile, energy companies continued to increase profits. For instance, Shell's profits of $11.5 billion (£8.4 billion) in the second quarter of 2022 was double the figure in the previous year. BP's profit of £6.9 billion in this period was three times larger than in 2021. Centrica, the owner of British Gas, made profits of £1.3 billion in the first half of 2022, five times larger than profits in the first half of 2021.

The British government said that it was giving £1,200 of support to the eight million households most in need, and £37 billion in total relief measures. It said, however, that energy price rises could not be prevented due to global gas price rises; one factor in this was the 2022 Russian invasion of Ukraine.

The campaign was launched mid-June 2022, started by 15–20 activists after discussion in April 2022. They maintain anonymity as, according to one, they could be "construed as inciting people to break contracts". One organiser said that the founders were "socially and class-conscious people who often discuss and make plans to respond to what we see as oppressive economic violence meted out on working-class people".

== Activity and size ==
Don't Pay UK began with a pledge that was to only go into effect if one million people in the UK signed it: signatories pledged to cancel their energy bill payments if the price increase set for 1 October 2022 took place. There were 28 million households in the country. Around 4.5 million people on pre-payment plans were not asked to participate, nor those whose energy bills are included in their rent price, to avoid self-disconnection and eviction.

On 22 July, a representative commented that sign-ups to volunteer were around 300 to 700 people per day; it had 6,000 volunteers by 27 July 2022. By 11 August, this figure was 31,000 volunteers. By 9 August 2022, the group reported 80,000 pledges. The figure reached 100,000 two days later. A drive to reach £25,000 in donations was at £23,000 from 1,750 donations on 17 August 2022.

By October 2022, there were 200,000 pledges, so the non-payment strike did not go ahead. Instead they planned protests on 1 October. Ofgem's price cap increased to £2,500—lower than projected, as a result of intervention by Prime Minister Liz Truss.

On 1 December 2022, Don't Pay UK encouragement non-payment to go ahead. It had 250,000 signatories at this point, according to the Morning Star. The group have also been involved in protests against fuel poverty.

== Methodology ==
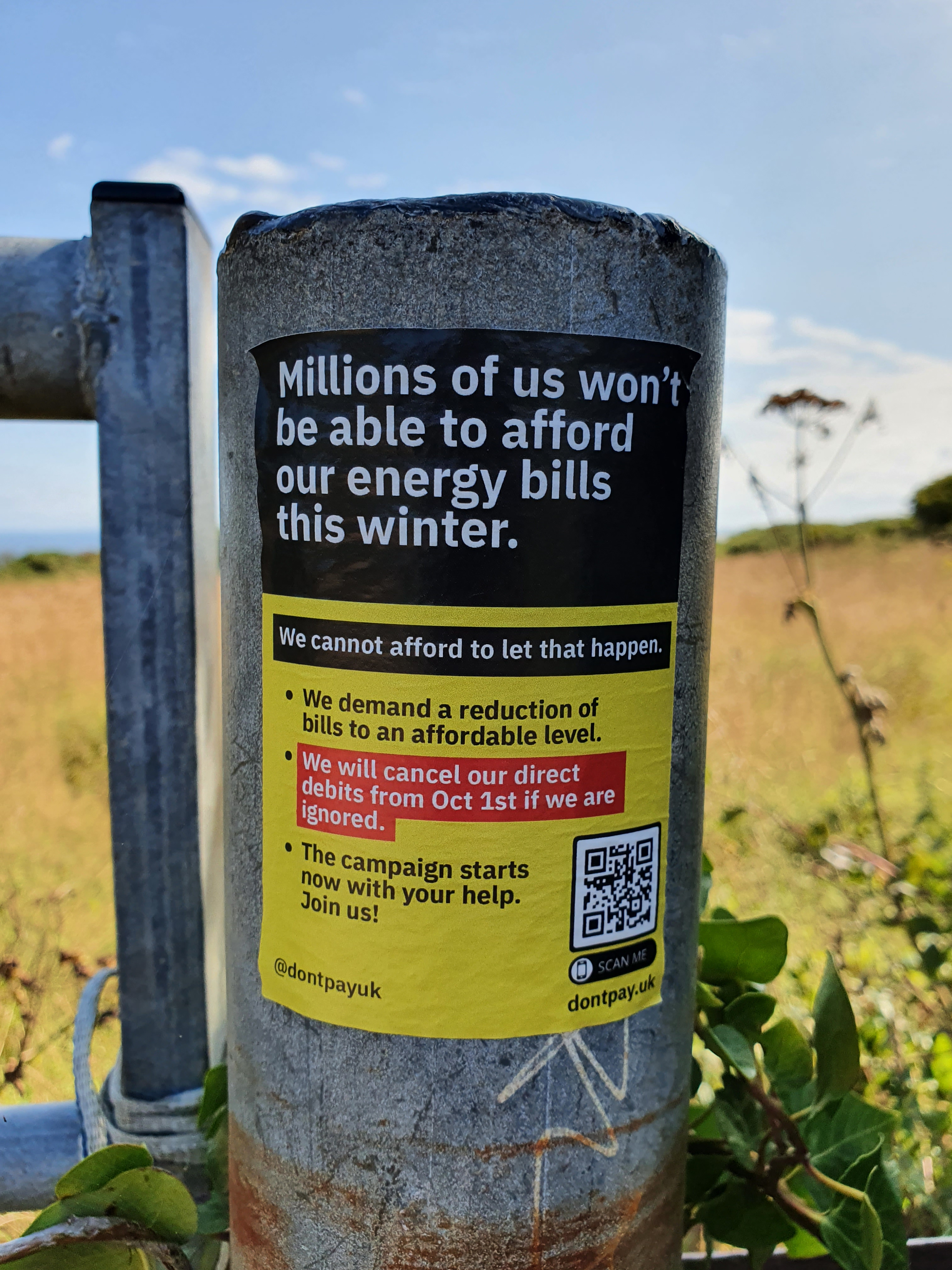
Don't Pay UK sticker on a gatepost in St Ives, Cornwall

Don't Pay UK is not affiliated with any other group, though they have been endorsed by Fuel Poverty Action. Organisers described it as a "non-aligned non-political party campaign". It sought to raise awareness through leaflets and posters: 20,000 leaflets were ordered in the group's first week, and 140,000 had been ordered by 19 July 2022. Poster designs on their website can be printed by volunteers. The organisation initially aimed for local groups to arise around the pledge. On 2 August, the group stated that 1,300 people were interested in acting as a local organiser. By 11 August, Don't Pay UK said that there were 150 local groups with 3,000 participants. Paul Mason said in the New Statesman in July 2022 that though modelled on the yellow vests protests, Don't Pay UK were "too concentrated in the big cities", so it was not clear if it would gain traction.

=== 1 October pledge ===
According to the group, if one million people had signed the pledge then £230 million would be withheld from energy companies each month, with a 28 day period before energy companies can contact people to arrange a payment plan. They call this a "mass non-payment strike". It is a type of civil disobedience. Don't Pay UK believed that this will "bring [energy companies] to the table and force them to end this crisis". However, they did not have fixed demands.

Don't Pay UK cited Margaret Thatcher's poll tax ("community charge") in 1989 and 1990—a tax with a fixed cost for each adult in the country—as a parallel. 17 million people refused to pay the poll tax, leading to its removal in 1991. Instead, Council Tax was introduced by John Major in 1993. Wilks-Heeg commented that differences between poll tax resistance and energy bill non-payment include that less detailed records were kept by the government and that debts were wiped.

=== Consequence of non-payment ===
Possible repercussions of participation include energy supply disconnections and worsened credit scores. However, Don't Pay UK commented that, in 2018, only eight energy supply disconnections were recorded. Energy companies can take action by remotely disconnecting smart meters, obtaining a court warrant to disconnect energy or install a pre-payment meter, or pass information to a debt collection organisation. They are not permitted to change meters during winter for some groups of people classified as "vulnerable". Additional costs can be accrued by non-payment. Worsened credit scores could lead to individuals having to pay higher interest when borrowing for up to six years, according to a financial services company owner. Don't Pay UK said that this was a low priority for many families.

Don't Pay UK argue that thousands of simultaneous non-payments would cause "paralysis" and a "months-long backlog". Zoe Wood of The Guardian said that the pledge is "high-risk" and that "there is not necessarily safety in numbers". A government spokesperson for the Department for Business, Energy and Industrial Strategy said the plan was "highly irresponsible" and would "push up prices for everyone else". Dontpay.uk lists some information on consequences in an FAQ. The group said that they were consulting with legal and personal debt experts in August.

The think-tank New Economics Foundation said that a "ripple effect" would begin at 6,000 participants and that non-payment would force government relief, otherwise Ofgem would have to increase prices at a faster rate. Journalist Martin Lewis said government financial relief was needed because "once it starts becoming socially acceptable not to pay energy bills people will stop paying energy bills and you're not going to cut everyone off". An associate professor at the University of Nottingham, Hafez Abdo, commented that the boycott could have "detrimental consequences on energy companies and supply chains", leaving them unable to pay for operating costs, and cause bankruptcies and job losses. Abdo said that government action was needed to avoid this outcome.

A spokesperson for the group said that inaction was more risky than participation, as paying energy bills "is driving people into poverty".

== See also ==
- United Kingdom cost-of-living crisis
- I Don't Pay Movement
- Enough is Enough (campaign)
- Just Stop Oil
