= Committee on Fuel Poverty =

UK non-departmental public body

The Committee on Fuel Poverty (CFP) is an advisory non-departmental public body of the government of the United Kingdom, sponsored by the Department for Energy Security and Net Zero. Its role is to advise on the effectiveness of policies aimed at reducing fuel poverty, and encourage greater co-ordination across the organisations working to reduce fuel poverty.

The Committee on Fuel Poverty replaced the former Fuel Poverty Advisory Group (FPAG). This follows a triennial review of FPAG which took place during 2014.

The former FPAG was established in 2001. The Triennial Review of FPAG in 2014 concluded that FPAG performed an important function as an expert advisory group and that it should continue in this role as an advisory Non-Departmental Public Body. It also recommended ways to improve the way in which it operates, to enhance its ability to provide independent, expert advice. The Department of Energy and Climate Change proceeded to reform the group during 2015, including transitioning the group's composition from organisational representatives to independent expert members, leading to the establishment of the CFP in place of the former FPAG.

== Membership ==
The CFP consists of a chair and five members. The chair was appointed by the then secretary of state in March 2015 and the members were appointed in January 2016. The chair and members are appointed for three years. Appointments to the CFP are made in accordance with the requirements of the Code of Practice for Ministerial Appointments to Public Bodies.

As of July 2017, its members were:

- Tom Wright (chair), chief executive of charity Age UK, and former chair of the British Gas Energy Trust
- Dr Alice Maynard,
- Jenny Saunders, chief executive of National Energy Action
- Paul Massara, former chief executive of npower
- David R. Blakemore. former director general of Phillips 66
- Lawrence Slade, chief executive for the energy industry trade body Energy UK

== See also ==
- Fuel poverty in the United Kingdom
