= United Kingdom cost-of-living crisis =

Ongoing cost-of-living crisis in the United Kingdom

In late 2021, the prices of many essential goods in the United Kingdom began increasing faster than household incomes, resulting in a fall in real incomes. The phenomenon has been termed a cost-of-living crisis. It is due in part to the economic impact of the COVID-19 pandemic, including a global surge in inflation, wage stagnation attributed to the Conservative Party's austerity programme, as well as the economic instability and mass migration caused by Brexit and the Russo-Ukrainian war.

While all in the UK are affected by rising prices, the crisis most substantially affects people living in poverty. The British government has responded with measures including grants, tax rebates, and subsidies to electricity and gas suppliers. Regular pay began to outpace inflation beginning in May 2023, but living costs have remained at elevated levels, and have continued to increase faster than headline inflation into 2025. The Joseph Rowntree Foundation projected in 2025 that disposable incomes would continue to decline for the rest of the decade.

== Definition ==
The Big Issue newspaper defines a cost-of-living crisis as "a scenario in which the cost of everyday essentials like energy and food is rising much faster than average incomes". The Institute for Government think tank defines the UK's cost-of-living crisis as "the fall in real disposable incomes (that is, adjusted for inflation and after taxes and benefits) that the UK has experienced since late 2021".

By January 2024, the 12-month Retail Price Index had fallen to 4% after peaking at 11.1% in October 2022, while workers' wages had risen 6.2% in the last quarter of 2023. In late 2023, the Resolution Foundation estimated that household incomes would not return to pre-crisis levels until at least 2027.

== Causes ==
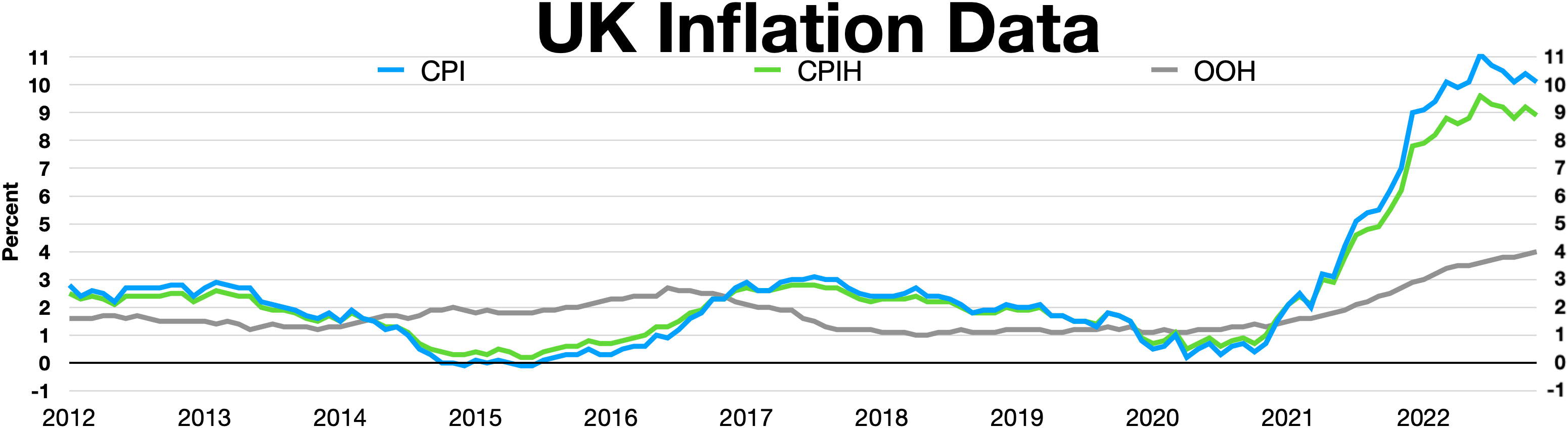
UK inflation data CPI CPIH (CPI+OOH) OOH Owner occupied housing inflation

Both global and local factors have contributed to the UK's cost-of-living crisis.

=== Global factors ===
According to Bank of England governor Andrew Bailey, about 80% of the causes driving the cost-of-living crisis are global. These include the various forms of instability the world has experienced in the early 2020s such as the COVID-19 pandemic, a chip shortage, an energy crisis, a supply chain crisis, Russia's invasion of Ukraine, and the 2026 Iran War. In 2021, the UK's inflation was less than that of the US, but high US inflation was not generally experienced as a cost-of-living crisis due to the stimulus cheques that had been distributed to American households.

=== Local factors ===
Britain suffered from wage stagnation after 2008, which has been attributed to the austerity programme. There has been no other comparable period of economic stagnation in Britain since records began during the Napoleonic Wars. Pay stagnation was particularly felt among younger demographics in the 2010s, but was not considered a major political issue until later in the decade. The middle class was sheltered from the effects of this at the time due to near-zero interest rates, and it did not affect pensioners – the core base of the Conservative party – as this group was already retired. This contributed to a lack of urgency during the Conservative-led governments of the era. The government of Theresa May did attempt to address this in the late 2010s with her targeting of those who could "just about manage"; stagnation was likely the impetus behind Boris Johnson's "levelling up" agenda.

Other local effects include labour shortages related to foreign workers leaving due to Brexit, and additional taxes on households. Factors that have worsened the crisis since 1 April 2022 include Ofgem increasing the household energy price cap by 54%, an increase in National Insurance and a rise in Council Tax. Researchers in the Centre for Economic Performance at the London School of Economics investigated trade flows and consumer prices of food products in the UK and found Brexit increased food prices due to increased red tape when food is imported from Europe. This affected poorer households disproportionately. Unemployed people in the UK receive lower fiscal support than the average for OECD countries; UK salaries have not risen substantially since the 2008 financial crisis.

Insufficient long-term gas storage left UK energy prices overexposed to market fluctuations. In 2022, household income – whether from earnings or benefits – had not generally kept pace with rising prices. In April 2022, UK real wages fell by 4.5%, the sharpest fall since records began back in 2001. By July 2022, inflation had risen to over 10%, the highest level in 40 years, and the Bank of England was forecasting it could reach 13% by the end of the year. Energy costs for the typical British household were expected to rise 80% from October 2022, from £1,971 to £3,549, until Liz Truss, who was Prime Minister at the time, announced measures to limit these increases.

On 23 September 2022, UK Chancellor Kwasi Kwarteng announced his mini-budget, backed by Truss, which included widespread tax cuts. The package included cuts to stamp duty and the abolition of the 45% income tax rate for those earning £150,000 or more a year. These cuts aimed to encourage foreign investment and economic growth but were not costed and spooked financial markets, causing the pound to fall to a low of $1.03. The Bank of England responded by raising interest rates, which caused mortgage payments to increase significantly. By late October 2022, Truss and Kwarteng had been replaced by Rishi Sunak and Jeremy Hunt, respectively, and all of the mini-budget's proposals had effectively been cancelled. The pound regained some strength by this point, but interest rates remained high, stretching household incomes.

== Effects and timeline ==
=== 2021–2024 inflationary wave ===
Inflation began rising sharply in 2021, affecting a wide range of goods and services. Transport costs have been especially affected, as have many others, including food, furniture, household items, electricity, and clothing. The Financial Times reported in May 2022 that the crisis caused UK consumer confidence to fall to its lowest level since 1974. In June, charities had reported the crisis is affecting people's mental health, with one publishing a survey where 9% of responding parents had said their children had begun self-harming. Based on an Office for National Statistics (ONS) survey performed between 27 April and 22 May 2022, 77% of UK adults reported feeling worried about the rising cost of living, with 50% saying they worried "nearly every day". A separate ONS survey taken from 25 May to 5 June found 52% of respondents had cut back on their energy use. While rising prices have affected all social classes, people experiencing poverty have been impacted the most. According to a survey by the Food Foundation think tank published in February 2022, one million UK adults went a whole day without eating over the past month.

The ONS reported that in the year to September 2022, there was a 22% increase in shoplifting. In response, some supermarkets installed new retail loss prevention systems that require customers to scan their printed receipt on an optical scanner as proof of purchase before they can exit the store. The systems have attracted some negative public reaction.

On 10 November 2022, nurses and other medical personnel in the NHS voted to strike, under the Royal College of Nursing. The nurses stated this was due to failing wages, inflation, overwork, and underfunding. The industrial action affected NHS hospitals throughout the UK. Nurses were still expected to work certain days at reduced capacity to ensure the NHS remained operational.

As lower-income households spend a greater share of their income on food and energy, two of the more rapidly inflating areas, these households face a higher effective inflation rate than the wealthy. In November 2022, this meant that the wealthier households were experiencing inflation of 9.6%, while poorer households experienced 12.5%. This gap in the effective inflation rate across income brackets was the highest on record. Due to heating costs, the effective inflation rate for those aged over 80 was 15.3% The Office for National Statistics (ONS) stated on 11 November that business investment fell during the three months to September and was below the pre-pandemic levels. Gross domestic product fell during the three months to September due to a decline in manufacturing "across most industries" according to the ONS.

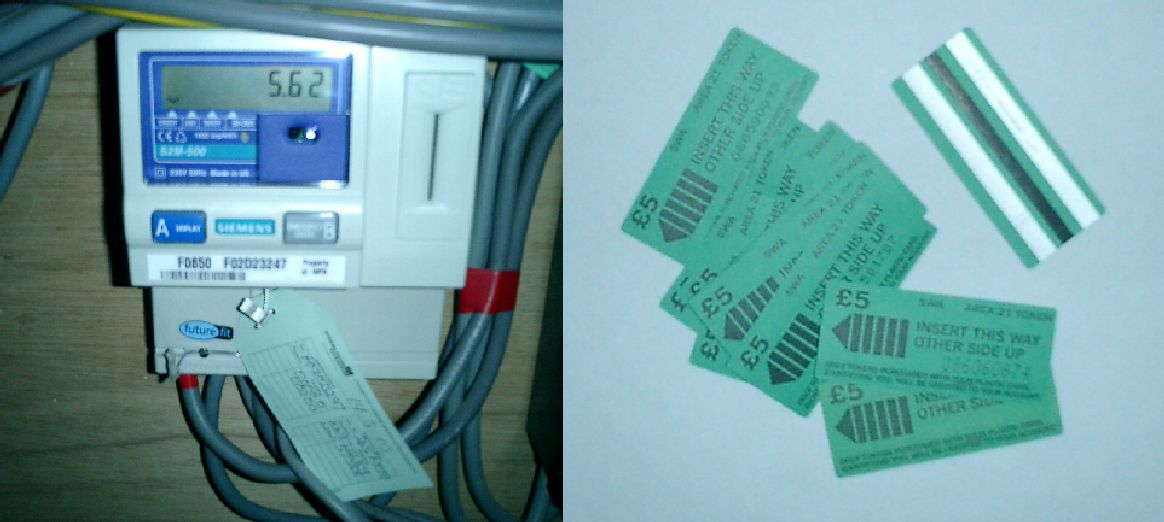
Energy companies controversially forced entry to some people's homes to install prepayment meters.

On 8 December 2022, The Guardian reported that according to research by the Joseph Rowntree Foundation, over 3 million UK low-income households could not afford to heat their homes. According to the foundation's research, roughly 710,000 households had difficulty paying for food, heating, and warm clothing. The foundation urged the government to increase Universal Credit. A government spokesperson said that support for the most vulnerable remained a priority and that millions of the most needy people were being given at least £1,200 in direct payments to protect them against rising prices, in addition to the £400 being given to each household towards energy costs. The spokesperson said that the support also included a winter energy price guarantee worth approximately £900 for a typical household, a household support fund to help with essential costs, and that the chancellor had announced further efforts to support those most in need in the following year.

Unpaid energy bills controversially led energy companies to switch customers to (more expensive) prepayment meters. The Times found that in some cases, energy companies forced their way into homes to install the hardware. Ofgem responded by temporarily banning the practice in February 2023, until new regulations were imposed in January 2024. In May 2025, Ofgem announced that eight suppliers would pay compensation to 40,000 customers who had been affected by "inappropriate installation".

The Joseph Rowntree Foundation said their research showed that hundreds of thousands of households could not afford to protect themselves from cold and that prices of essentials were rising steeply, with energy bills nearly double the level of the previous winter. A briefing from the Department of Health and Social Care, detailing the plans they have made to take on thousands of volunteers to counteract staff shortfalls during the 2022/23 winter, included warnings about the impact on hospital admissions that the cold weather, increased fuel prices and cost of living might have, especially for the elderly.

On 5 September 2023, Birmingham City Council, the largest local authority in Europe, issued a Section 114 notice declaring itself effectively bankrupt. In May 2024, the 12-Month CPI, which is the official measure of inflation in consumer prices in the United Kingdom, reduced to the official Bank of England target of 2%.

=== 2024–2025 inflationary wave ===
Inflation remained at the target only briefly and had returned to 3% by the end of 2024, with living costs still elevated. While theft in general remained far lower than its peak in the early 1990s, shoplifting continued to increase rapidly. A 20% increase in 2024 led to a record high for shoplifting, seen particularly among older demographics.

April 2025 was nicknamed "awful April" by several media outlets, noting above-inflation increases in many household bills, chiefly water and energy. These bill increases included an average 26.1% increase in water and sewage bills, the fastest increase since the late 1980s. Inflation reached 3.8% in July 2025, far lower than the 11.1% seen in October 2022 but still above the 2% target. It was expected to reach 4% in September, but remained at 3.8% for three consecutive months, before falling to 3.6% in October 2025. Food inflation was at 4.9% in July 2025, which is particularly problematic for low-income households.

=== 2026 ===
Increasing energy bills contributed to an annual inflation rate of almost 3%.

Job vacancies declined from 706,000 to 702,000 in the three months to August 2026. The number of workers on company payrolls also edged down, largely reflecting job losses in the retail and hospitality sectors. According to Liz McKeown, the ONS director of economic statistics, vacancies remain at their lowest level outside the pandemic period for more than a decade, with smaller businesses continuing to cite rising labour costs as a factor weighing on hiring decisions.

== Responses ==
=== Government ===
Early government responses to rising inflation included a 6.6% increase in the minimum wage, announced in 2021 and effective in April 2022. The UK government intensified its efforts to address the cost-of-living crisis in May 2022, introducing a £5 billion windfall tax on energy companies to help fund a £15 billion support package for the public. The package included every household receiving a £400 discount on energy bills, in addition to a £150 council tax refund that the government had already ordered. For about 8 million of the UK's lowest-income households, a further £650 payment was announced. Additionally, pensioners or those with disability would qualify for extra payments, on top of the £550 that every household gets, and the £650 they would receive if they had a low income.

In June 2022, business secretary Kwasi Kwarteng ordered an urgent review of the motor fuel market, to be completed by 7 July, to determine whether consumer prices were excessively high. The measures were called insufficient by many people and organisations, including outgoing Prime Minister Boris Johnson, with the Bank of England predicting that the UK would enter recession by 2023.

Johnson's successor Liz Truss announced a package of subsidies to address rising energy bills, with an estimated cost of up to £150 billion, depending on future wholesale prices. The main piece of this package was the Energy Price Guarantee, which would mean that a UK household with "average energy usage" would pay no more than £2,500 a year on energy, although this was widely misinterpreted as Truss stated in media interviews that "nobody would pay more than £2,500". She later clarified this, while ruling out introducing a new windfall tax on the profits of energy producers and suppliers. The subsidies were initially planned to last for two years for consumers and six months for businesses, but in October the new Chancellor Jeremy Hunt said that the package would continue until April 2023 and that from this date support would be targeted at "the most vulnerable."

After he was appointed prime minister in October 2022 following Truss's resignation amid an economic and credibility crisis caused by the September 2022 mini-budget proposed by Truss and Kwarteng, Rishi Sunak continued the package of subsidies for rising energy bills. As chancellor, he provided some funding to help vulnerable people cope with the rising cost of living.

In October 2022, the Scottish government introduced an act to freeze rents and establish a moratorium on evictions in Scotland for both the private rented and social sectors. Reports indicate that rent increases of up to 50% have been observed in London.

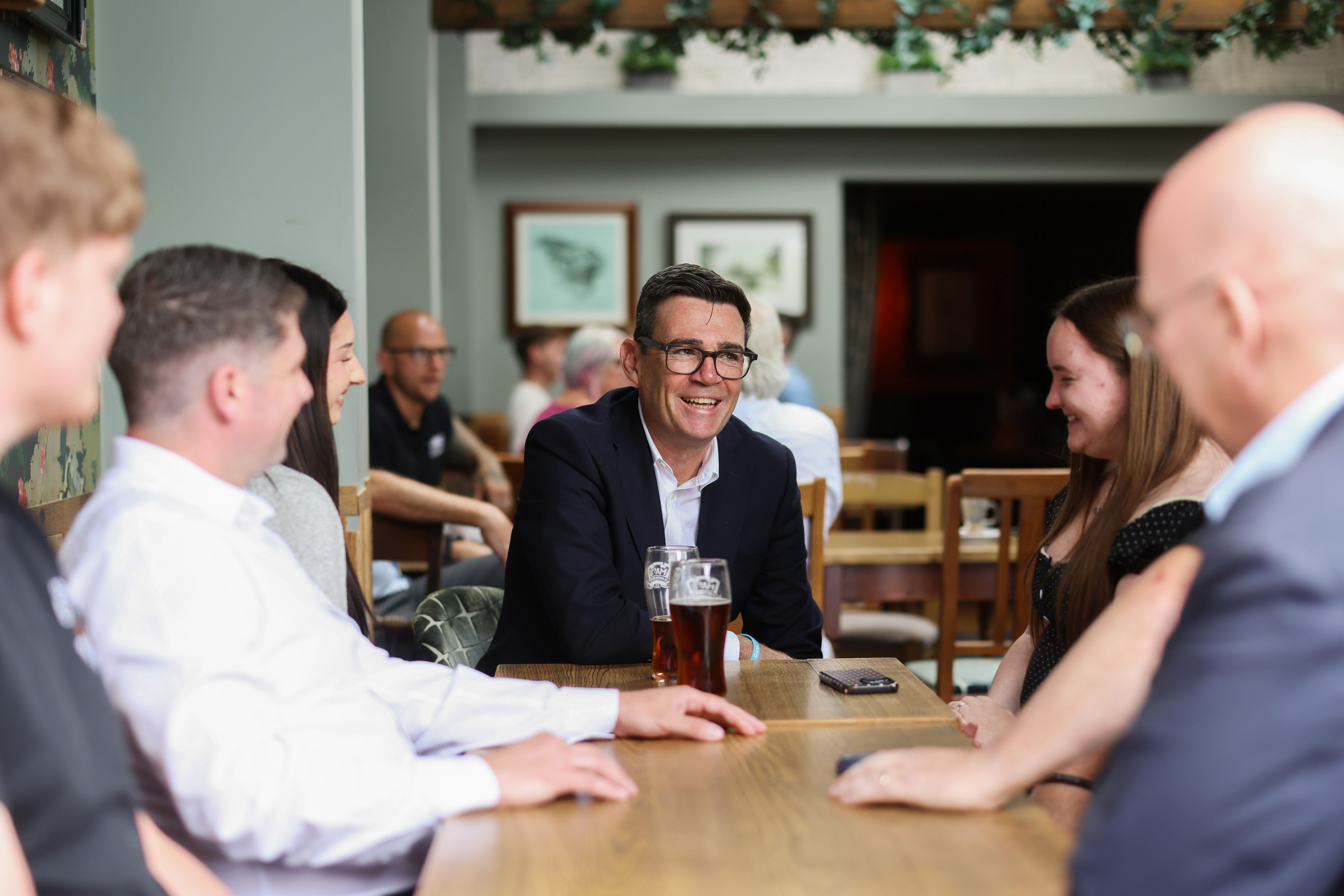
Prime Minister Andy Burnham announcing a 20 percent cut in business rates for pubs, clubs and live music venues at The Hare pub in Harlow in July 2026.

After becoming Prime Minister in July 2026, Andy Burnham scheduled the removal of the 5% value-added tax on household electricity bills in England, Scotland and Wales for six months, commencing in October 2026. Burnham also scheduled a 20% reduction of business rates for all but the most successful pubs, clubs and live music venues in England for April 2027.

From January to December 2027, bus fares in England outside London are to be capped at £2. The cap was £3 when Burnham became prime minister. Burnham has also said that he will remove the 9:30 am time limit on disabled person bus passes from April 2027. Devolved governments are to be allocated money for corresponding fare reductions.

=== Civil and political ===
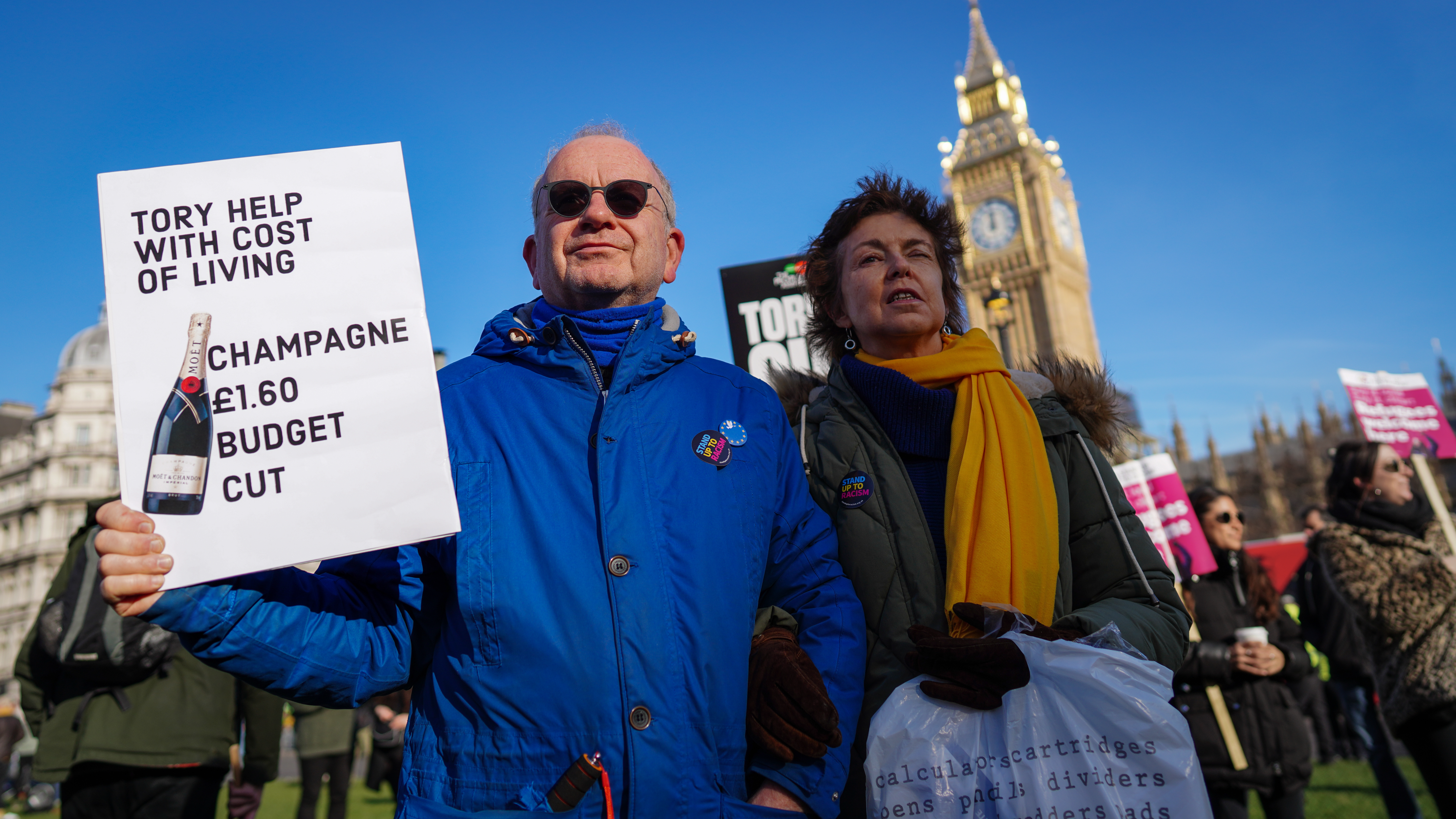
Protesters in London in February 2022, campaigning for the UK Government to address and reduce the cost-of-living.

Various campaigns, such as Don't Pay UK, were established to encourage the government to implement further assistance.

The campaigner Jack Monroe warned that the crisis could be fatal for some of the children of low-income parents, and asked the government to increase benefits in line with inflation. UK civil society continues to respond to the hardship caused by the cost-of-living crisis, such as by running foodbanks, though some foodbank managers report both extra demand but also lower levels of donations, as the crisis means some people who could previously donate can no longer afford to do so. On 18 June 2022, thousands of workers marched to Parliament in London to demand further government action for the cost-of-living crisis.

A campaign called "Enough is Enough" was organised by trade union leaders to lobby during the crisis. Its demands include a return to pre-April 2022 energy rates, a real-terms pay rise for public sector workers, a rise in the national minimum wage, a reversal of the National Insurance increase, and a £20-per-week increase in Universal Credit payments. Within a few weeks of its August 2022 launch, almost 450,000 people had joined the movement. It gained some high-profile supporters, including the Mayor of Greater Manchester Andy Burnham and US Senator Bernie Sanders.

In November 2023, The Trussell Trust calculated that a single adult in the UK in 2023 needs at least £29,500 a year to have an acceptable standard of living, up from £25,000 in 2022. Two partners with two children would need £50,000, compared to £44,500 in 2022. Twenty-nine per cent of the UK population—which works out to 19.2 million people—belong to households that bring in below a minimum figure.

=== Media response ===
The cost-of-living crisis has been noted by the media, as well as workers' unions, as one of the reasons for industrial action by staff in industries such as the railway strikes, bus strikes and action by legal aid lawyers.

In September 2022, the BBC soap opera Doctors began covering the topic in a long-running issue-led storyline featuring Scarlett Kiernan (Kia Pegg) and her father struggling to survive. In October 2022, the BBC launched "Tackling It Together" – a collective brand for existing TV and radio programmes and new initiatives such as newsletters – to offer consumers help navigating the cost-of-living crisis.

== See also ==
- 2021–2023 inflation surge
- Don't Pay UK
- Economic impact of the Russo-Ukrainian war (2022–present)
- Economic impact of the COVID-19 pandemic in the United Kingdom
- Fuel poverty in the United Kingdom
- Hunger in the United Kingdom
- Income in the United Kingdom
- Retail Price Index
- United Kingdom government austerity programme
- Universal basic income in the United Kingdom
- United States affordability crisis
