= CESP =

CESP may refer to:

- Citizens for East Shore Parks (CESP), American environmental organization
- Companhia Energética de São Paulo, electricity company, São Paulo, Brazil
- Community Energy Saving Programme, a UK Government program funding energy efficiency improvements and installation of low and zero carbon heating technologies in income deprived areas.
