= Johnny Ball =

English television personality (born 1938)

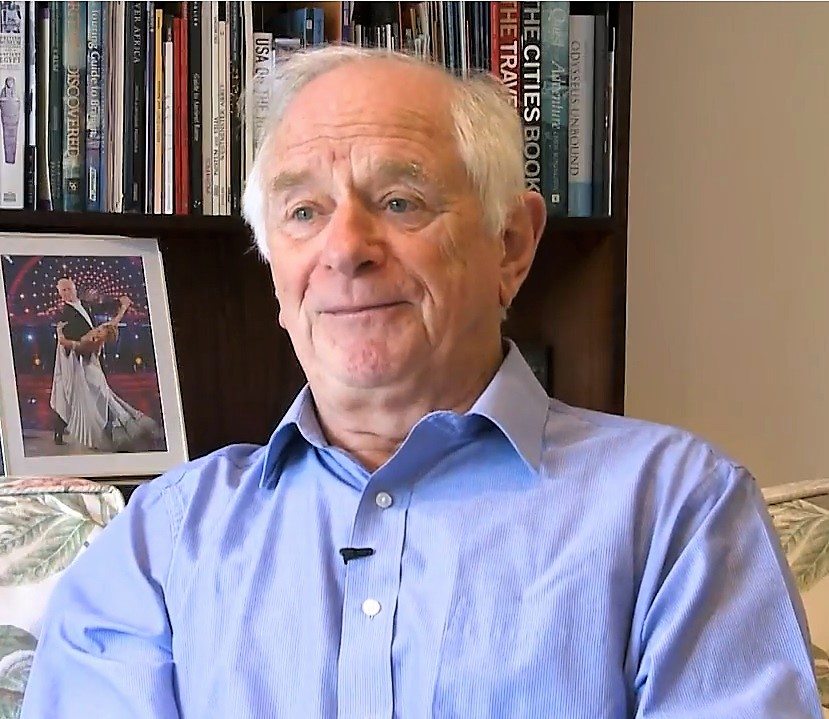
- Ball in 2019
- Born: Graham Thalben Ball; 23 May 1938 (age 88); Bristol, England
- Occupations: Television presenter; writer
- Years active: 1967–present
- Spouses: Julia Anderson (m. 1969; div. 1972) Diane Hicks (m. 1975)
- Children: 4, including Zoe

Graham Thalben Ball, professionally known as Johnny Ball (born 23 May 1938), is an English television personality, children's television presenter, writer and populariser of mathematics. Ball regularly appeared on British television for several decades, predominantly on the BBC, from 1967, featuring in or presenting programmes such as Play School, Think of a Number, Think Again, Think It ... Do It, Think...This Way and Johnny Ball Reveals All. He has also published a number of non-fiction books.

== Early life ==
Ball was born in Bristol and attended Kingswood Primary School on the eastern edge of the city (now outside Bristol). Later in his childhood the family moved to Bolton, Lancashire, where he attended Bolton County Grammar School. He left formal education with two O-Levels, one in mathematics and one in geography. He was called up for national service and spent three years in the Royal Air Force. He was posted to Wales as a radar operator and was later sent to Germany to monitor the Hamburg-Berlin air corridor.

Ball began his entertainment career by working as a Butlin's Redcoat, and was an entertainer in northern clubs and cabaret. He was nicknamed Johnny after John Ball, who played for Bolton Wanderers from 1950 to 1958 and the name stuck.

== Television and radio career ==
Ball was one of the hosts of pre-school programme Play School beginning in 1967 and continuing throughout the 1970s and beyond. He was also a regular fixture on children's television from the mid 1970s and throughout the 1980s, presenting several series of science and technology programmes intended for children, including Think of a Number; Think Again; Think Backwards; Think...This Way and Johnny Ball Reveals All. As well as appearing on screen Ball wrote jokes for some shows including Crackerjack. All of these shows (except the ITV programme ...Reveals All) appeared on the BBC. Ball's shows were known for presenting scientific and technological principles in an entertaining and accessible way for young people.

In 2003, Ball appeared on The Terry and Gaby Show in which he answered viewers' questions. In July 2004, he was named in the Radio Times list of the top 40 most eccentric TV presenters of all time. In July 2012, he presented a Horizon special on ageing on BBC Four. He has starred in ITV and Channel 4 television adverts as well as radio adverts for the Yorkshire-based firm Help-Link.

In 2012, Ball took part in the Strictly Come Dancing television show, where he was paired with Aliona Vilani. A training accident in the three-week interval resulted in torn ligaments for Vilani, causing her to retire temporarily from the show. She was replaced by Iveta Lukošiūtė who, with Ball, was eliminated in the first week. Vilani returned in the final group dance alongside Ball. In an interview in October 2017, Ball said that Vilani faked the injury, with Vilani denying the allegation and saying she would take legal advice over Ball's comments. There are no reports that she subsequently took any form of legal action.

In May 2026 Ball appeared, alongside his daughter Zoe, who was the subject of the BBC genealogy series Who Do You Think You Are?.

== Personal life ==
Ball married Julia (née Anderson) in 1969. The marriage produced one child, television and radio presenter Zoe Ball, before their divorce in 1972.

Ball married Diane (née Hicks) in 1975. The couple live in Buckinghamshire.

== Series guide ==
Think of a Number

- Pilot: 2 April 1977
- Series 1: 6 editions – 12 April 1978 – 17 May 1978
- Series 2: 6 editions – 12 September 1979 – 17 October 1979
- Series 3: 6 editions – 10 September 1980 – 15 October 1980
- Series 4: 6 editions – 15 September 1982 – 20 October 1982
- Series 5: 6 editions – 4 January 1984 – 8 February 1984
- Series 6: 6 editions – 26 September 1984 – 31 October 1984

Think Again

- Series 1: 5 editions – 9 January 1981 – 6 February 1981
- Series 2: 6 editions – 8 January 1982 – 12 February 1982
- Series 3: 6 editions – 7 January 1983 – 11 February 1983
- Series 4: 6 editions – 13 September 1983 – 18 October 1983
- Series 5: 6 editions – 10 September 1985 – 15 October 1985

Think!Backwards

- Five editions shown over one week – 28 September 1981 – 2 October 1981

Think! This Way

- Five editions shown over one week – 28 March 1983 – 1 April 1983

Think It ... Do It

- Series 1: 6 editions – 11 March 1986 – 15 April 1986
- Series 2: 6 editions – 27 February 1987 – 3 April 1987

Knowhow

- Series 1: 6 editions – 8 March 1988 – 12 April 1988
- Series 2: 6 editions – 25 October 1988 – 29 November 1988
- Series 3: 6 editions – 2 January 1990 – 6 February 1990 (does not feature in series 3)

Johnny Ball Reveals All

- Series 1: 7 editions – 14 June 1989 – 26 July 1989
- Series 2: 6 editions – 3 August 1990 – 7 September 1990
- Series 3: 7 editions – 18 March 1992 – 29 April 1992
- Series 4: 7 editions – 5 July 1993 – 16 August 1993
- Series 5: 5 editions – 8 August 1994 – 1 September 1994

(source: BBC)

== Other activities ==
- Ball was the Rector of the University of Glasgow from 1993 to 1996.
- In November 2006, Ball voiced his opposition to the Safeguarding Vulnerable Groups Act, which would require any adult working with children to be vetted by the Criminal Records Bureau. In an interview with The Sunday Times, he said: "It is like George Orwell's 1984... a quarter of adults will have to be checked... The fear we are instilling in [children] is abhorrent."
- In 2007 it was reported that Ball rejected the scientific consensus on climate change, stating that "carbon dioxide has been unfairly victimised in the debate." He supports the expansion of nuclear power and has given speeches arguing for its development. On 15 December 2009, he was booed off stage at a London show for his views on climate change.
- From 2020 to 2021 Ball appeared five times as a speaker on Numberphile, a YouTube channel hosted by Brady Haran. In his episodes he spoke about "Russian multiplication", "The Mesolabe Compass and Square Roots", "Parabolas and Archimedes", "The Volume of a Sphere", and "Area of the Q".

== Bibliography ==
- Ball, Johnny (2025). My Previous Life in Comedy. The Book Guild Ltd. ISBN 978-1835741665.
- Ball, Johnny (2005). Think of a number. Dorling Kindersley. ISBN 1-4053-1031-6.
- Ball, Johnny (2005). Go Figure!. Dorling Kindersley. ISBN 0-7566-1374-4. (American edition of "Think of a Number")
- Ball, Johnny (1982). Johnny Ball's Think Box. Puffin. ISBN 0-14-031545-4.
- Ball, Johnny (1987). Johnny Ball's Second Thinks. Puffin. ISBN 0-14-031819-4.
- Ball, Johnny (1983). Plays for Laughs. Puffin. ISBN 0-14-031548-9.
- Ball, Johnny (1979). Think of a number. BBC. ISBN 0-563-17755-1. (different from the 2005 book of the same name)
- Ball, Johnny (2009). Mathmagicians. Dorling Kindersley. ISBN 978-1-4053-3727-4.
- Ball, Johnny (2011). Ball of Confusion. Faber and Faber. ISBN 978-1-84831-348-4.
- Ball, Johnny (2017). Wonders Beyond Numbers. Bloomsbury Sigma. ISBN 978-1-47293-998-2.

Academic offices
Preceded by Pat Kane	Rector of the University of Glasgow; 1993–1996	Succeeded by Richard Wilson
