= November 2025 United Kingdom budget =

United Kingdom budget statement delivered in November 2025

- Presented: 26 November 2025
- Country: United Kingdom
- Parliament: 59th
- Party: Labour Party
- Chancellor: Rachel Reeves
- Total revenue: £1.304 trillion
- Total expenditures: £1.416 trillion
- Deficit: £112 billion

The November 2025 United Kingdom budget was delivered to the House of Commons by Rachel Reeves, the Chancellor of the Exchequer, on 26 November 2025.

The budget's main announcements included extending the freeze on personal tax thresholds from April 2028 to April 2031, changes to the National Insurance treatment of pension salary sacrifice, a new High Value Council Tax Charge from April 2028, and the continuation of temporary fuel duty support with a planned staged reversal in 2026. In addition, it included measures on welfare and household costs, such as ending the two-child limit in Universal Credit from April 2026 and changes intended to lower average household energy bills in Great Britain from April 2026, alongside announcements on skills funding, NHS services and prescription charges, and pensions.

The Office for Budget Responsibility (OBR) forecast that borrowing would fall over the five-year forecast period and that public debt would peak in the late 2020s, and it assessed that the government's fiscal rules were being met. On Budget day, the OBR's November 2025 Economic and fiscal outlook was inadvertently accessible online ahead of its official release, prompting an investigation published on 1 December 2025 and the resignation of OBR chair Richard Hughes the same day.

== Background ==
Ahead of the statement, the House of Commons Library published a background briefing on the economic and fiscal context. It said that the UK economy had been growing at an annual rate of around 1.5% on average from mid-2024, with growth slowing during 2025. It noted that while GDP was higher than before the COVID-19 pandemic, GDP per head had risen only modestly over the same period, reflecting weak growth in consumer spending.

The Chancellor said she remained committed to balancing the current budget by 2029/30 while protecting public services, and she warned that the budget would involve "hard choices". The OBR's March 2025 forecast assessed that the current budget balance rule was met with headroom of £9.9 billion in 2029/30, and in November 2025 it assessed that headroom had increased to £22 billion after the budget measures were included in its forecast. The OBR said the budget combined a near-term increase in spending with tax rises that were weighted towards later years, increasing the headroom against the fiscal rules compared with the pre-measures forecast.

In an interview with Sky News' political editor Beth Rigby on 22 November 2025 at the 2025 G20 Johannesburg summit, Prime Minister Keir Starmer refused to rule out implementing manifesto-breaking tax hikes in the budget.

== Key measures ==
The House of Commons Library briefing highlighted changes to personal taxation, local taxation, motoring taxes, welfare and energy policy, alongside a range of other measures announced in the budget.

=== Taxation ===
- A freeze on personal tax thresholds for income tax and National Insurance contributions would be extended for three years from April 2028 to 2031.
- From April 2029, only the first £2,000 of pension contributions made by an employee through a Salary sacrifice scheme will be exempt from National Insurance contributions, with National Insurance due on contributions above that cap.
- From April 2026, the income tax rates on dividends for basic and higher rate taxpayers are to rise by 2 percentage points, to 10.75% and 35.75%.
- From April 2027, income tax on the property and savings elements of an individual's income is to rise by 2 percentage points, to 22%, 42% or 47% depending on the individual's marginal rate.
- An increase in Remote Gaming Duty from April 2026 and a new higher rate of General Betting Duty on certain remote bets from April 2027, alongside the abolition of bingo duty from April 2026.
- A reduction in capital gains tax relief for disposals to employee ownership trusts, effective from 26 November 2025.

=== Local taxation ===
- A High Value Council Tax Charge is to be introduced from April 2028 on properties valued at £2 million and above (in 2026 prices). Set as a flat annual charge of £2,500 for properties valued between £2 million and £2.5 million, rising to £7,500 for properties valued at £5 million or more, with the charge intended to rise with CPI inflation over time.
- In England, the government announced changes to the business rates system from April 2026, including:
  - New lower multipliers for eligible retail, hospitality and leisure properties with rateable value below £500,000.
  - A higher multiplier for properties above that threshold, and a transitional relief scheme to cap annual bill increases between 2026 and 2029.
  - A 100% relief for electric vehicle charging points.

=== Transport ===
- Extended the temporary 5p cut in fuel duty and cancelled the inflation-linked rise, freezing headline rates to September 2026. It set out a staged reversal of the temporary cut, with increases of 1p per litre from 1 September 2026, a further 1p per litre from 1 December 2026, and 2p per litre from 1 March 2027, completing the reversal, and said fuel duty rates would be uprated by Retail Price Index inflation from April 2027.
- A new mileage charge for electric vehicles from April 2028, payable alongside Vehicle excise duty, the government said it would consult on the proposal.

=== Welfare and cost of living ===
- The two-child limit on Universal Credit would be removed from April 2026. The Commons Library briefing said the change was expected to reduce the number of children in poverty by 450,000 by 2029/30, compared with what it otherwise would have been.
- A one-year freeze in regulated rail fares in England from March 2026.
- Increases in the National Living Wage and other minimum wage rates from April 2026 following recommendations by the Low Pay Commission.

=== NHS and prescription charges ===
- Deliver 250 new Neighbourhood Health Centres in England, described as "one stop" centres intended to bring together services including GPs, nurses, dentists and pharmacists, with an initial focus on access to general practice and support for people with complex needs and long-term conditions in areas of high deprivation. The Commons Library briefing said that of the first 120 centres, due to be completed by 2030, 70 would be new builds delivered through public-private partnerships, with the remainder delivered by reusing existing estate or public capital funding.
- A freeze in Prescription charges in England at £9.90, which the Commons Library briefing said would cost around £15 million a year.

=== Pensions ===
- Provide inflation protection from 1 January 2027 for pre-1997 defined benefit pensions in the Pension Protection Fund and the Financial Assistance Scheme where members' former schemes had provided it.
- The investment reserve of the British Coal Staff Superannuation Scheme would be transferred to scheme members.

=== Skills ===
- £725 million for a Growth and Skills Levy, intended to replace the Apprenticeship Levy and widen the range of training employers could access with their levy funding.
- £425 million for a Youth Guarantee for the period up to 2028/29, intended to offer young people aged 18 to 21 access to further learning, help to get a job or help to get an apprenticeship.

=== Energy policy ===
- Measures intended to reduce average household energy bills in Great Britain by around £150 from April 2026, including changes to:
  - the Renewables Obligation, the government planned to fund 75% of the domestic share of the Renewables Obligation in 2026/27, 2027/28 and 2028/29.
  - the Energy Company Obligation, which would not be renewed after the current scheme ends on 31 March 2026.
- Additional funding for a Warm Homes Plan, including an expanded Warm Home Discount Scheme.

=== Other ===
- The introduction of an international student levy on providers, set at £925 per student per year from August 2028.
- A reduction in the annual cash ISA limit from £20,000 to £12,000 from April 2027, while leaving the overall annual ISA limit at £20,000. The £20,000 annual cash ISA limit will remain for those over the age of 65.
- The repayment thresholds for plan 2 Student Loans will frozen for a further three years from 6 April 2027.

== Economic forecast and public finances ==
The budget was accompanied by the OBR's November 2025 Economic and fiscal outlook, which set out updated forecasts for the economy and public finances. The House of Commons Library briefing said the OBR forecast GDP growth of about 1.4% to 1.5% in each year from 2025 to 2030, revising up its forecast for 2025 while revising down its forecast for later years compared with its previous forecast earlier in 2025.

The House of Commons Library briefing reported that the OBR forecast public sector net borrowing to fall from £150 billion in 2024/25 to £138 billion in 2025/26, and to £67 billion by 2029/30, with public debt forecast to peak at 97.0% of GDP in 2028/29 before easing.

The OBR said the current budget balance target was met in 2029/30 with a margin that increased to £22 billion after the budget policy measures were included in its forecast, and described this as a larger buffer than in its pre-measures forecast.

In November 2025 the OBR announced that it would assess public finances against the government's fiscal rules once a year, while continuing to publish two economic forecasts a year to coincide with spring and autumn fiscal statements.

== Reception ==
The Institute for Fiscal Studies said the budget amounted to a large net tax rise while also increasing headroom against the government's fiscal rules, but it noted higher borrowing in the short term and that later-year plans relied heavily on tax rises later in the parliament.

The Resolution Foundation said the budget increased fiscal headroom while leaving public finances weaker in the next few years, and it highlighted the extension of the personal tax threshold freeze as the largest revenue-raising measure. It welcomed the removal of the two-child limit and measures intended to cut household energy bills, and described parts of the package as moving towards more equal tax treatment of different income sources.

The Institute for Public Policy Research said the budget made progress on stabilising the public finances, relieving pressure on working families and raising revenues to protect public services, and it highlighted measures including the removal of the two-child limit and moves intended to cut energy bills. IPPR North welcomed measures it said would support the cost of living and devolution, including a new overnight visitor levy for mayoral authorities and the new High Value Council Tax Charge as a step towards broader council tax reform.

The Joseph Rowntree Foundation welcomed the removal of the two-child limit and said measures to lower energy bills, hold down transport costs and increase the minimum wage would help families with day-to-day costs, while arguing that families still faced pressure from high housing costs and weak safety nets.

Trade unions gave mixed responses. The Trades Union Congress said the budget would provide "urgent relief" for households through measures on energy bills, pay and child poverty, and it supported tax rises falling on the wealthiest while calling for a continued focus on affordability in future fiscal events. UNISON welcomed the removal of the two-child limit but said the government should move faster and sustain investment in public services, and criticised the extension of frozen tax thresholds. GMB said the budget marked a move away from austerity and called for investment to support growth, while Unite criticised the threshold freeze as a "stealth tax" on workers and said it was the wrong choice.

Business organisations gave mixed assessments. The British Chambers of Commerce said the budget avoided large new tax rises on businesses but did not provide a stronger plan for growth, while the Confederation of British Industry said some measures would increase employment costs and called for a clearer approach to tax reform. The Federation of Small Businesses described it as a tax-raising budget and criticised the overall tax burden, while also welcoming some measures aimed at small firms.

In the Commons debate, Conservative Party leader Kemi Badenoch criticised the budget and said it involved a £26 billion tax rise, and shadow chancellor Mel Stride said the government had made the wrong choices and should focus on reducing the deficit and lowering taxes.

== Office for Budget Responsibility leak ==
On 26 November 2025, during the pre-publication process for the OBR's November 2025 Economic and fiscal outlook (EFO), the OBR uploaded the EFO PDF to its website in advance of the Chancellor's budget statement. An investigation commissioned by the OBR found that the PDF was accessible via a predictable URL for 38 minutes between 11:30 and 12:08, and that it was accessed 43 times by 32 unique IP addresses before it was taken offline.

The report said there was no evidence that the early access was caused by hostile cyber activity or by wrongdoing within the OBR, and attributed it to configuration errors in the website's WordPress publishing setup that allowed access controls to be bypassed. It said the weaknesses were likely pre-existing, and that logs showed one instance of premature access to the March 2025 EFO, which it described as most likely benign, and it recommended a forensic review of recent publications.

The report recommended that the OBR change its arrangements for publishing future EFOs, including considering moving time-sensitive publications to a more secure platform, and said it would cooperate with the Financial Conduct Authority if required. Following the publication of the investigation on 1 December 2025, OBR chair Richard Hughes resigned with immediate effect, and HM Treasury said it would begin an external recruitment process to appoint a successor.
