= White certificates =

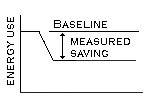
When determining the extent of energy saving, the energy use is compared against a baseline, which is an estimate of the energy use in the absence of any attempt at saving energy. This approach was developed over 20 years ago and is the basis for measurement and verification (M&V) of energy savings. It is fully described in the International Performance Measurement and Verification Protocol (IPMVP) and maintained by the Efficiency Valuation Organization (EVO). A succinct version of the IMPVP is found in the IPMVP Generally Accepted Principles published by EVO in October 2018

In environmental policy, white certificates are documents certifying that a certain reduction of energy consumption has been attained. In most applications, the white certificates are tradable and combined with an obligation to achieve a certain target of energy savings. Under such a system, producers, suppliers or distributors of electricity, gas and oil are required to undertake energy efficiency measures for the final user that are consistent with a pre-defined percentage of their annual energy deliverance. If energy producers do not meet the mandated target for energy consumption they are required to pay a penalty. The white certificates are given to the producers whenever an amount of energy is saved whereupon the producer can use the certificate for their own target compliance or can be sold to (other) parties who cannot meet their targets. Quite analogous to the closely related concept of emissions trading, the tradability in theory guarantees that the overall energy saving is achieved at least cost, while the certificates guarantee that the overall energy saving target is achieved.

A white certificate, also referred to as an Energy Savings Certificate (ESC), Energy Efficiency Credit (EEC), or white tag, is an instrument issued by an authorized body guaranteeing that a specified amount of energy savings has been achieved. Each certificate is a unique and traceable commodity carrying a property right over a certain amount of additional energy savings and guaranteeing that the benefit of these savings has not been accounted for elsewhere.

== Practical applications ==
=== Europe ===
In Europe, several countries have implemented a white certificate scheme or are seriously considering doing so. Great Britain started in 2002, Italy in January 2005; France and Denmark a year later. Great Britain has combined its obligation system for energy savings with the possibility to trade obligations and savings. The Netherlands and Poland are seriously considering the introduction of a white certificate scheme in the near future. Spain introduced a white certificate scheme in 2023.

In the UK, the Energy Efficiency Commitment (2002–2005) program required that all electricity and gas suppliers with 15,000 or more domestic customers must achieve a combined energy saving of 62 TWh by 2005 by assisting their customers to take energy-efficiency measures in their homes: suppliers must achieve at least half of their energy savings in households on income-related benefits and tax credits. In the second (2005–2008) EEC 2, energy saving targets were raised to 130 TWh suppliers, and here suppliers with at least 50,000 domestic customers (including affiliated licenses) are eligible for an obligation. The third phase runs from April 2008 to December 2012 and is intended to deliver 185 Mt CO_{2} lifetime savings by 2012.

=== United States ===
Connecticut, Pennsylvania, and Nevada have adopted Energy Efficiency Portfolio Standards that require regulated utilities to meet a certain percentage of their projected power needs through energy efficiency. Utilities must meet their obligations by either reducing their consumers’ energy usage, or by purchasing energy efficiency certificates (white certificates). More states are expected to follow in the near future.

There is also a voluntary market where large corporations are purchasing energy efficiency certificates as a way of meeting their corporate commitments to reduce their carbon footprints. Sterling Planet, a market maker in renewable energy certificates (RECs) is also making a market for voluntary purchases of White Tags. Sterling Planet helped develop Connecticut's Energy Efficiency Standard and is presently the only company actively involved in this space.

The white certificate concept is an offshoot of the more mature renewable energy credit or "green tag" trading. The market for white certificates is expected to grow larger than the green tag market because it requires less government approval and expense to install energy efficiency measures in factories and commercial buildings than to construct most renewable energy projects.

One issue arising is how to avoid allowing customers to "double dip" in white tag and other incentive programs for energy efficiency, such as ISO New England's forward capacity market and the Regional Greenhouse Gas Initiative3.

== See also ==
- Additionality
- Energy conservation
- Ukeep
