= I Don't Pay Movement =

I Don't Pay Movement Κίνημα Δεν Πληρώνω
- Leader: Vasilis Papadopoulos
- Founded: 13 March 2012
- Dissolved: 2020
- Membership: 200,000
- Ideology: Socialism; Anti-austerity; Anti-capitalism; Euroscepticism
- Political position: Left-wing to far-left
- National affiliation: Course of Freedom (2019)
- Colors: Red; Yellow; Black

Website
- epitropesdiodiastop.blogspot.com

I Don't Pay Movement (Greek: Κίνημα Δεν Πληρώνω, Kínima den Pliróno or Den plirono) was a Greek political party founded in March 2012 by citizens who participated in the "I Don't Pay" Movement. The philosophy of the movement, like that of its counterpart in the United Kingdom, is that social goods should be free and accessible to all members of society. It participated in the May 2012 national elections and won 0.9% of the vote.

== History ==
The "I Don't Pay Movement" was first established in 2008 as an activist group which performed acts of civil disobedience – it allowed drivers to bypass highway toll booths and reconnecting electricity to households that lost their access to electricity due to unaffordable bills. The group's activities gained massive popularity, allowing "I Don't Pay" to become a social movement, and its actions expanded to organizing anti-fascist and anti-racist demonstrations, labor disputes and general strikes. The movement founded a multimedia team that produces videos of professional quality, further promoting the movement. The main organizers of the movement also wishes to provide a left-wing counterweight to the far-right activism of Golden Dawn, which also focused on protesting austerity.

By 2011, the movement inspired a mass campaigning of civil disobedience in which ordinary citizens refused to pay for road tolls, bus tickets or doctors' consultations fees. The campaign was endorsed by most left-wing parties of Greece. Left-wing parties, such as Syriza, also actively encouraged and participated in the movement – when financial fraud inspectors arrested a restaurateur on the island of Hydra for failing to issue receipts in August 2012, Syriza MPs supported the local population in besieging the local police precinct. The campaign also extended to refusing to pay utility bills. The movement incorporated social dissatisfaction with austerity measures implemented by the government, and challenged the government's ability to enforce and mandate these policies.

In March 2012, the movement also became a political party, with Vasilis Papadopoulos as its leader. The founding members of the party were also Elias Papadopoulos, Leonidas Papadopoulos, Maria Lekakou and Yannis Damoulis. It participated in the May 2012 Greek legislative election. It also refined its forms of protest – the party formed small teams of participants who kept toll station barriers open for specific days, and promoted the movement by carrying its flags, posters, stickers and cockades. The party also blocked ticket validation machines in Athens. The protests were supported by Greek left-wing parties, including Syriza, which encouraged the protesters to continue not paying taxes and fees, and promised to abolish them should it take power.

In August 2015, the party announced its cooperation with Popular Unity. In the 2019 European Parliament election in Greece, the movement ran together with the far-left populist party Course of Freedom; Two leaders of the I Don't Pay Movement, Leonidas and Elias Papadopoulos, ran on the electoral lists of Course of Freedom. Ultimately, the party failed to gain any seats.

The party dissolved in 2020. In 2021, Stelios Kouloglou called for a restoration of the I Don't Pay Movement.

== Ideology ==
I Don't Pay Movement is known for organizing mass civil disobedience actions, including not paying for public services such as subway fares and highway tolls, in protest of poor public services and the austerity measures. In its manifesto, the party stated that it emerged as a movement because of the crisis of capitalist, and that it constitutes "a new form of struggle of working and lower middle classes". It interpreted refusal to pay toll fees and taxes as resistance against the transfer of social assets to private companies and banks.

The movement is ideologically left-wing and directs its actions against privatisation and private companies, capitalism and capitalistic actors. The stated goal of the movement is "to overthrow capitalistic actors, like the government and private companies." The Greek government is denounced as the main initiation of austerity measures such as new taxation, wage and pension cuts, and abolition of pension rights. The movement also protests the issue of corruption, which it links to international institutions such as the European Union and the International Monetary Fund. The party also argues that Greece leave the Eurozone. Some have criticized the movement for being "hijacked by left-wing parties".

Among other things, the party proposed:

- Remove all the country's toll stations - free roads for everyone;
- Remove all rate hikes which were imposed on citizens;
- Free heating for the unemployed, poor and large families;
- Free travel and free access to public transportation for all;
- Nationalization of banks under the control of the people;
- Popular sovereignty;
- National independence and social justice;
- Rupture with neoliberal policies and the European Institutions that support them;
- Fight against fascism;
- Ceasing of privatisation;
- Restructuring of the society on socialist foundations.

The movement stresses that it is not apolitical, with Elias Papadopoulos remarking: "the framework for the function of the movement is a political one. We do not favor an apolitical activism. When you act against the biggest interests in the country, the big constructors, the banks, the big international funds, the international capital, anybody can understand that our activism is a deeply political one." While most members of the party hold communist beliefs, it is underlined that the movement is open to anyone who shares anti-austerity and anti-establishment values; however, the party excludes far-right movements.

The party also proclaims: "Our action is an anticapitalist one. It's the sand in the gears of the system, even though many people do not approach it that way. It can adopt itself in different situations and tackle specific problems that have emerged mainly during the crisis, but are actually issues deriving from capitalism itself. Thus, we cannot separate those things. Our action is antimemorandum, opposite to the crisis and against capitalist standards, like hyperconsumption." The movement seeks to represent "the exploited social strata" and secure people's free access to public goods along with the creation of a solidarity network.

== See also ==
- Don't Pay UK
- List of political parties in Greece
