= Sherelle Jacobs =

British journalist

Sherelle Emma Jacobs is a British columnist and opinion writer. She is the Assistant Comment Editor at The Daily Telegraph and has previously written for The Guardian.

== Early life and education ==
Jacobs was born in the London borough of Brent in 1988. Her mother was the daughter of a Wolverhampton steel worker and her father, who ran a greeting card store, was an immigrant from Nigeria. Jacobs has said she is "from a family of working-class people whose lives were defined by their flunking of the 11 plus", and that her "white ancestors literally worked themselves to death in coal pits".

Jacobs attended St Paul's Girls' School.

== Career ==
Jacobs started her career working on the breaking news desk for Deutsche Welle in Bonn, Germany. Jacobs subsequently worked in Tunisia as a freelance journalist. While in Tunis, her journalistic interest was focused on the problems of Arab Spring and the rise of Islamist extremism in the Maghreb.

She is the Assistant Comment Editor at The Daily Telegraph and has previously written for The Guardian.

She appeared on the panel of the BBC's Question Time in November 2019 and on Any Questions? in May of the same year and September 2025.

== Views ==
Jacobs is a Brexit supporter and has been described by The Conservative Woman website as a rising star. She is a climate change denialist, having called the UN Intergovernmental Panel on Climate Change a "post-truth scam" and the prevailing consensus on climate change "groupthinkishly unscientific.

In February 2019, Jacobs was criticised by Owen Jones for using the term "Cultural Marxism" in an editorial for the Daily Telegraph.

In April 2024, Jacobs argued that Israel's continued assault on Gaza was "existentially vital – for both Israel but (sic) the wider West". In August 2025 on the eve of the Putin–Trump summit in Alaska, she argued that Ukraine had lost the war against Russia in the West's gravest foreign policy mistake and Europe needed to build up its military power to prepare for a larger future conflict.
