= Income in the United Kingdom =

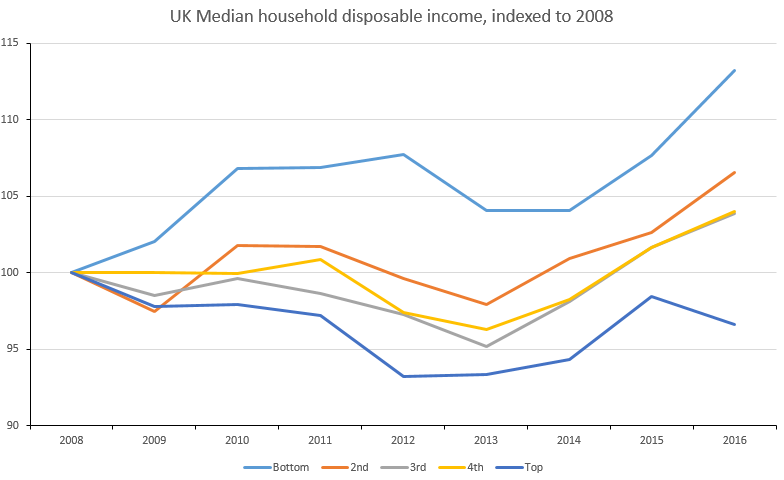
UK median household disposable income by income group for 2008–2016, indexed to 2008

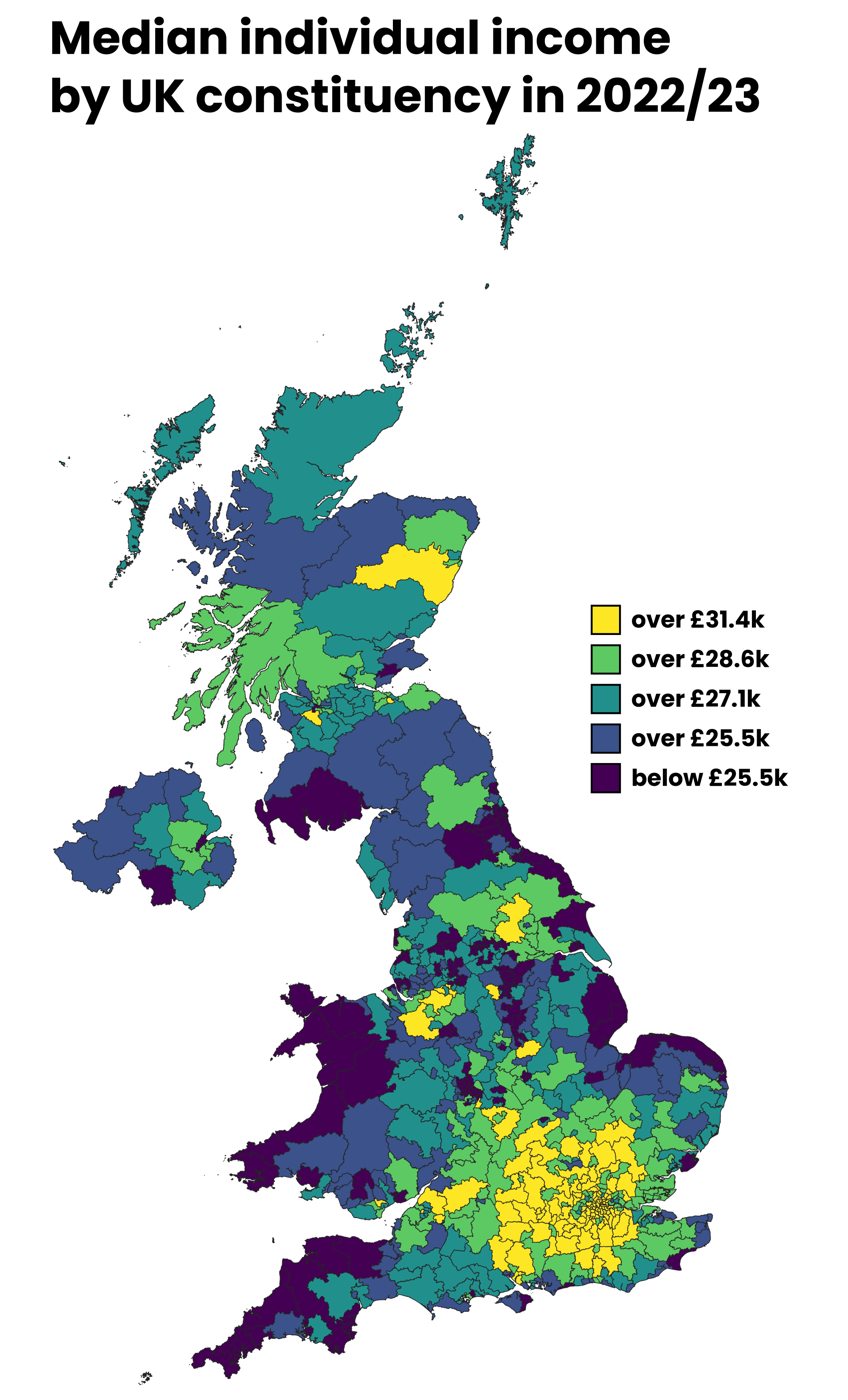
Median individual by UK constituency in tax year 2022/23. Data from HMRC Table 3.15a Income and tax by Parliamentary constituency.

Median household disposable income in the UK was £36,700 in the financial year ending (FYE) 2024, up 0.8% (£279) compared with FYE 2023. Over the last 10 years (FYE 2015 to FYE 2024) median household disposable income has increased by 7.0%, with an average increase of 0.8% per year.

Median income of people living in retired households remained relatively stable with a small increase of 0.2% (£74) in FYE 2024, while the median income of people living in non-retired households grew by 1.7% (£629) in FYE 2024.

In September 2023, Joseph Rowntree Foundation calculated that a single adult in the UK in 2023 needs at least £29,500 a year to have an acceptable standard of living, up from £25,000 in 2022. Two partners with two children would need £50,000, compared to £44,500 in 2022. 29% of the UK population – which works out to 19.2 million people – belong to households that bring in below a minimum figure.

== Data sources ==
There are a number of different sources of data on income which results in different estimates of income due to different sample sizes, population types (e.g. whether the population sample includes the self-employed, pensioners, individuals not liable to tax), definitions of income (e.g. gross earnings vs original income vs gross income vs net income vs post tax income).

The Survey of Personal Incomes (SPI) is a dataset from HM Revenue and Customs (HMRC) based on individuals who could be liable to tax. HMRC does not hold information on individuals whose income is below the personal allowance (£8,105 in 2012/13). Furthermore, SPI does not include income from non taxable benefits such as housing benefits or Jobseeker's Allowance.

The Annual Survey of Hours and Earnings (ASHE) is a dataset from an annual survey of approximately 50,000 businesses by the Office for National Statistics (ONS) and covers annual earnings, public and private sector pay differential and the gender pay gap. ASHE does not cover self-employed individuals.

The Households Below Average Income (HBAI) dataset is based on the Family Resources Survey (FRS) from the Department for Work and Pensions (DWP). It includes information on equalised household disposable income and can be used to represent the distribution of household income and income inequality (Gini coefficient).

Other data sources include Average Weekly Earnings, Labour Force Survey, Index of Labour Cost per Hour, Unit Labour Costs, Effects of Taxes and Benefits on Household Income / Living Costs and Food Survey, European Union Statistics on Income and Living Conditions, Pensioners Income Series, Wealth and Assets Survey, National Accounts Estimates of Gross Disposable Household Income, and Small Area Income Estimates.

== Taxable income ==
Annual income percentiles for taxpayers in the UK, before and after income tax. In the SVG file, hover over a graph to highlight it.

The most recent SPI report (2012/13) gave annual median income as £21,000 before tax and £18,700 after tax. The 2013/14 HBAI report gave median household income (2 adults) as £23,556. The provisional results from the April 2014 ASHE report give median gross annual earnings of £22,044 for all employees and £27,195 for full-time employees.

According to the OECD the average household net-adjusted disposable income per capita is $27,029 a year (in USD, ranked 14/36 OECD countries), the average household net financial wealth per capita is estimated at $60,778 (in USD, ranked 8/36), and the average net-adjusted disposable income of the top 20% of the population is an estimated $57,010 a year, whereas the bottom 20% live on an estimated $10,195 a year giving a ratio of 5.6 (in USD, ranked 25/36).

The 2013/14 HBAI reported that 15% of people had a relative low income (below 60% of median threshold) before housing costs.

Data from HMRC 2012–13; incomes are before tax for individuals. The personal allowance or income tax threshold was £8,105 (people with incomes below this level did not pay income tax).

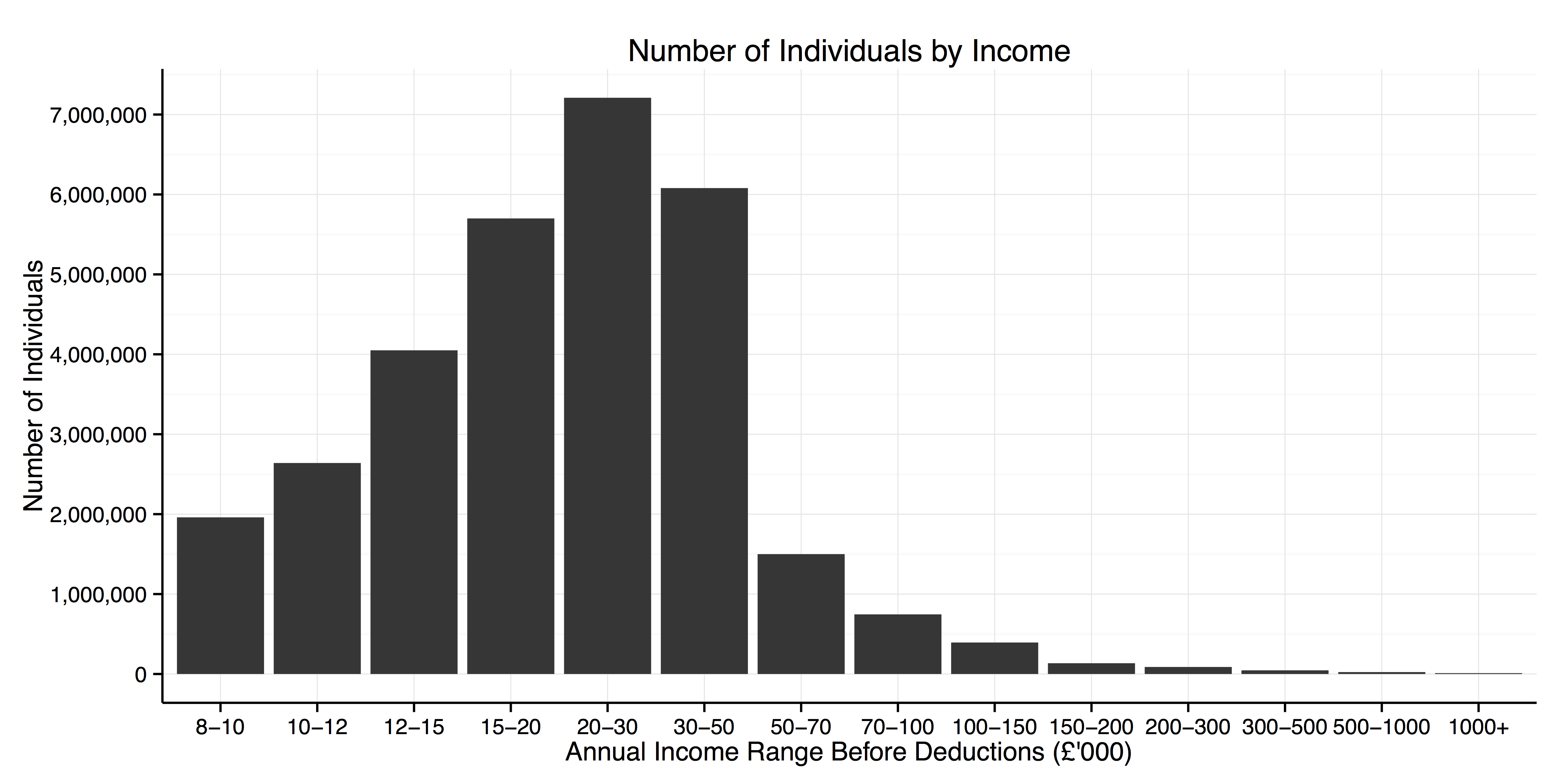

=== Income by location ===
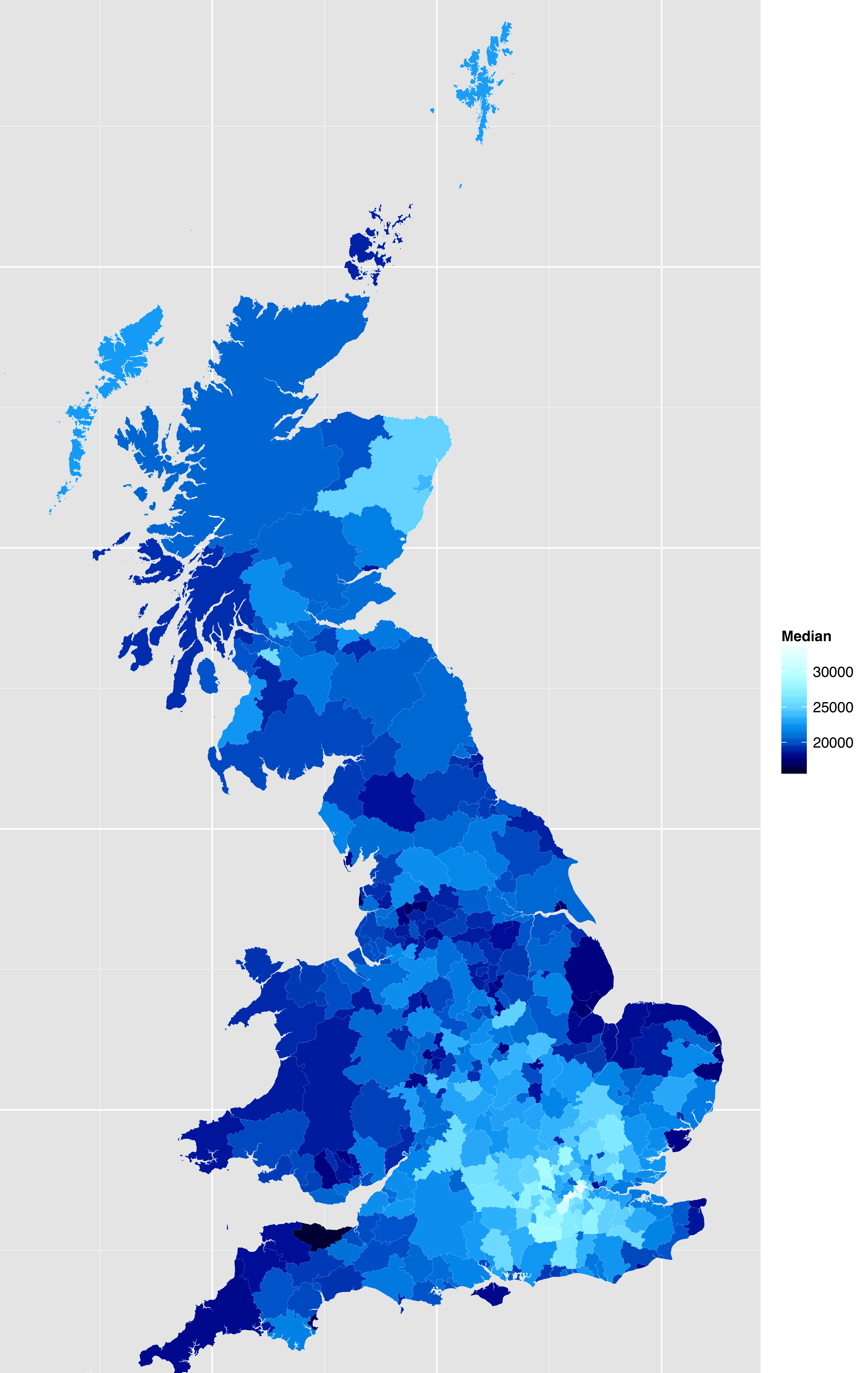
Median income by location on the island of Great Britain

Income can vary considerably by location. For example, the locations (local administrative unit) with the highest incomes were the City of London, Kensington and Chelsea, and Westminster with median annual incomes of £58,300, £37,800 and £35,200 respectively. The locations with the lowest incomes were Hyndburn, Torbay, and West Somerset with median annual incomes of £17,000, £16,900 and £16,000 respectively.

A 2017 report from Trust for London found that London has a poverty rate of 27%, compared to 21% in the rest of England.

Gross disposable household income (GDHI) in the UK in 2020 by local authority

=== Income by age and gender ===
Data from the Survey of Personal Incomes for tax year 2021 to 2022.

=== Income by occupation ===
The tables below shows the ten highest and ten lowest paid occupations in the UK respectively, as at April 2014.

Occupation	Median full-time gross weekly pay (£)
Aircraft pilots and flight engineers	1,746.6
Air traffic controllers	1,549.4
Chief executives and senior officials	1,533.3
Marketing and sales directors	1,298.7
Advertising and public relations directors	1,289.5
Information technology and telecommunications directors	1,226.7
Legal professionals (not included elsewhere)	1,217.3
Medical practitioners	1,167.1
Brokers	1,149.9
Financial managers and directors	1,143.0

Occupation	Median full-time gross weekly pay (£)
Cleaners and domestics	285.5
Nursery nurses and assistants	285.2
Other elementary services occupations (not included elsewhere)	279.9
Retail cashiers and check-out operators	278.7
Leisure and theme park attendants	272.7
Kitchen and catering assistants	268.4
Hairdressers and barbers	267.8
Launderers, dry cleaners and pressers	259.3
Waiters and waitresses	257.6
Bar staff	253.6

== Post-tax household income ==
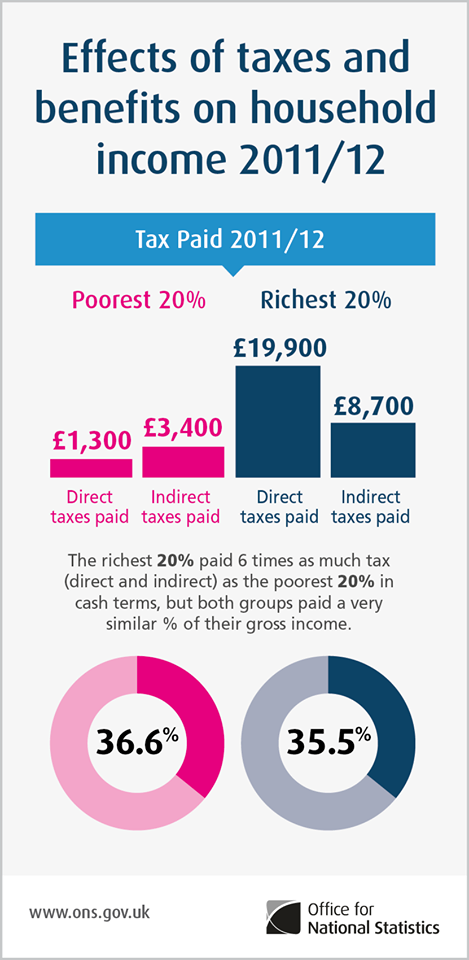
Effects of taxes and benefits on household income in 2011/12

Data from the Households Below Average Income (HBAI) report from the Department for Work and Pensions 2013/14:

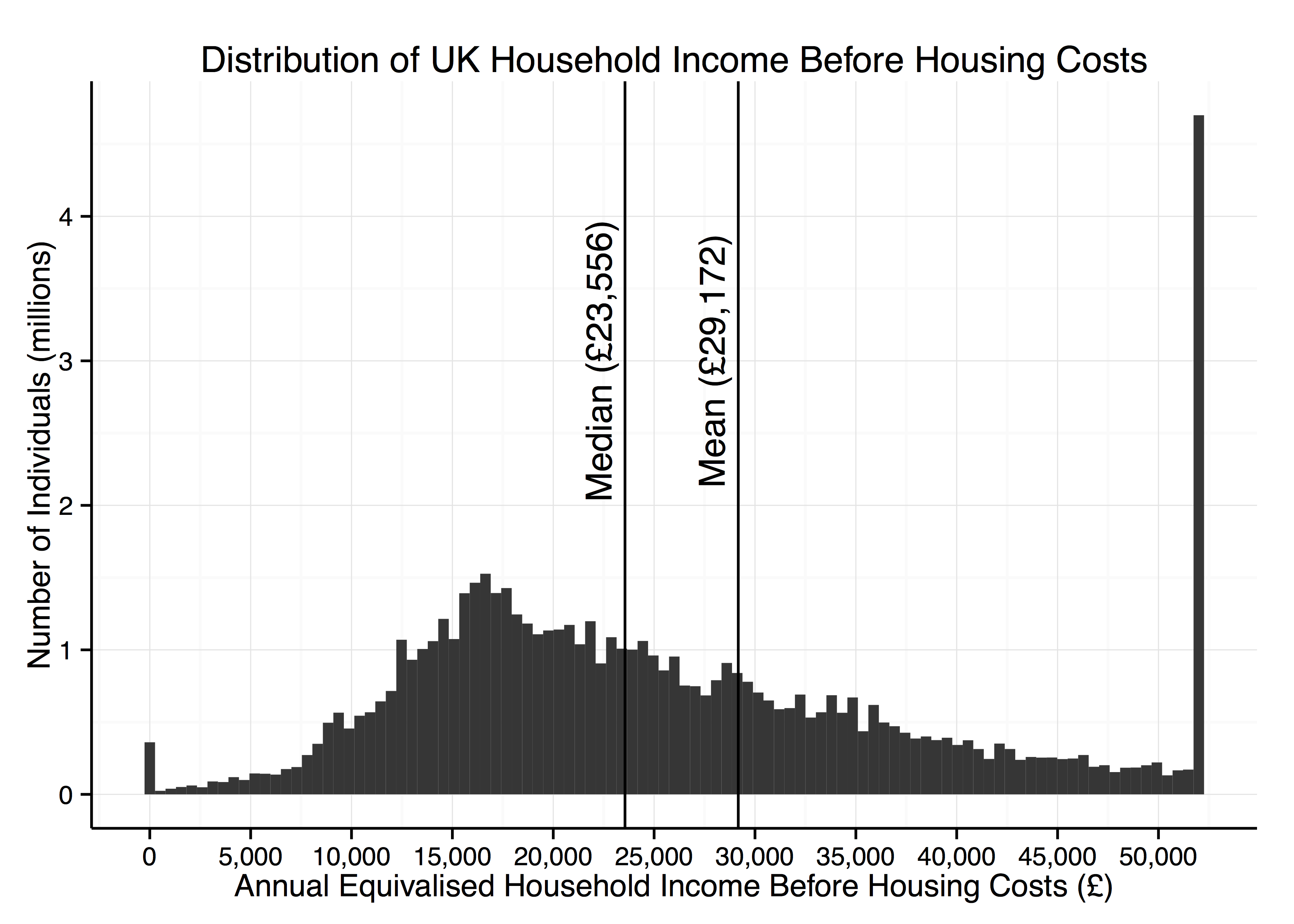

Data from HMRC – Percentile points of the income distribution as estimated from the Survey of Personal Incomes, note this only includes individuals who pay some income tax:

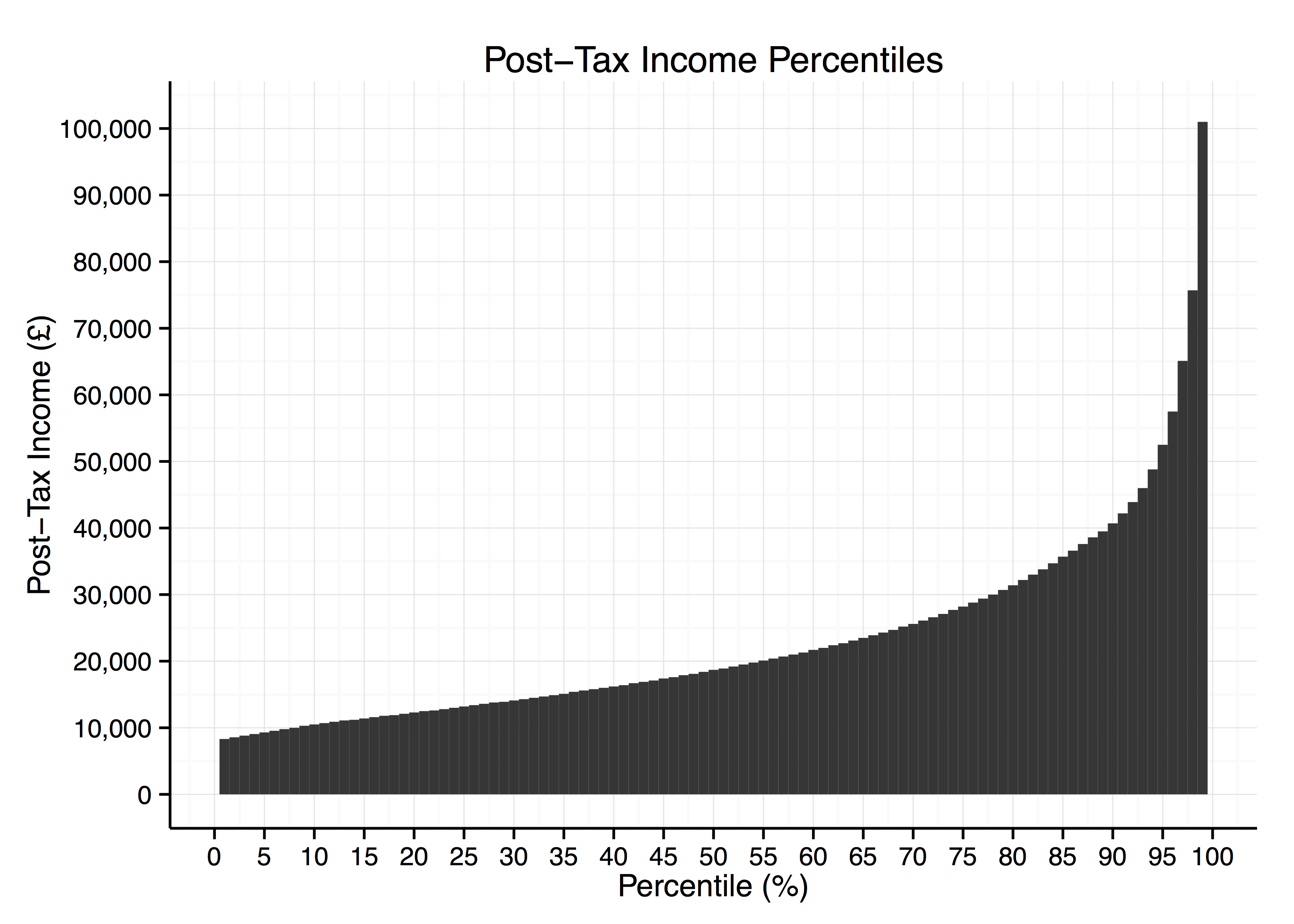

== Wealth ==
The Office for National Statistics found that the median total wealth for individuals in Great Britain was estimated to be £125,000 between April 2018 and March 2020. The mean figure is £305,000, reflecting the unequal wealth distribution with the wealthiest 10% of individuals owning close to half (48.58%) of all wealth.

Percentage of total wealth held by individuals in each individual wealth decile
Wealth Decile	Percentage of total wealth held
1st (lowest) wealth decile	0.02%
2nd wealth decile	0.38%
3rd wealth decile	0.79%
4th wealth decile	1.60%
5th wealth decile	3.11%
6th wealth decile	5.24%
7th wealth decile	8.17%
8th wealth decile	12.35%
9th wealth decile	19.76%
10th (highest) wealth decile	48.58%

== High income ==
The Institute for Fiscal Studies issued a report on the UK's highest earners in January 2008. In 2004-05 There were 42 million adults in the UK of whom 29 million were income tax payers. (The remainder are pensioners, students, homemakers, the unemployed, those earning under the personal allowance, and other unwaged.) A summary of key findings is shown in the table below:

2004-05 Data	All taxpayers	Top 10% to 1% (adults)	Top 1% to 0.1% (adults)	Top 0.1% (adults)
Number	29.5 million	4.21 million	421,000	42,000
Entry level for group	£5,093	£35,345	£99,727	£351,137
Mean value for group	£24,769	£49,960	£155,832	£780,043
Average income tax paid	£4,415	£10,550	£49,477	£274,482
Percentage of national personal income	100%	27.6%	8.6%	4.2%

The top 0.1% were 90% male and 50% of these people were in the 45 to 54 year age group. 31% of these people lived in London and 21% in South East England. 33% of these people were company directors (as reported to HMRC). 30% worked in finance and 38% in general business (includes law). The very richest rely on earnings (salary and bonuses) for 58% of income. Income from self-employment (such as partnerships in law or accountancy firms) accounts for 23% of income and about 18% from investment income (interest and share dividends).

== Sources of income ==
The Family Resources Survey is a document produced by the Department for Work and Pensions. This details income amongst a representative sample of the British population. This report tabulates sources of income as a percentage of total income.

Region	Employment (salaries and wages)	Self employed	Investment income	Working tax credit	State pensions	Occupational pensions	Disability benefits	Other social security benefits	Other income sources
UK	64%	11%	2%	1%	6%	7%	2%	5%	2%
Northern Ireland	60%	11%	1%	2%	7%	5%	4%	7%	3%
Scotland	66%	7%	2%	2%	7%	7%	3%	5%	2%
Wales	60%	8%	2%	2%	8%	8%	4%	6%	1%
England	64%	11%	2%	1%	6%	7%	2%	5%	2%
North East England	64%	5%	2%	2%	8%	6%	4%	7%	2%
North West England	59%	13%	2%	2%	7%	7%	3%	6%	2%
Yorkshire	64%	7%	2%	2%	7%	7%	2%	5%	3%
East Midlands	65%	9%	2%	1%	7%	6%	2%	5%	3%
West Midlands	62%	8%	3%	2%	8%	6%	2%	5%	3%
Eastern England	56%	22%	2%	1%	5%	7%	1%	3%	2%
London	71%	10%	2%	1%	4%	4%	1%	5%	3%
South East	66%	9%	4%	1%	7%	8%	1%	4%	2%
South West England	60%	9%	4%	1%	7%	10%	2%	4%	2%

Other social security benefits include: Housing Benefit, Income Support and Jobseeker's Allowance

== See also ==
- Poverty in the United Kingdom
- Taxation in the United Kingdom
- Pension provision in the United Kingdom
- United Kingdom labour law
- Universal basic income in the United Kingdom
- Universal Credit
