= Enough is Enough (campaign) =

British political campaign

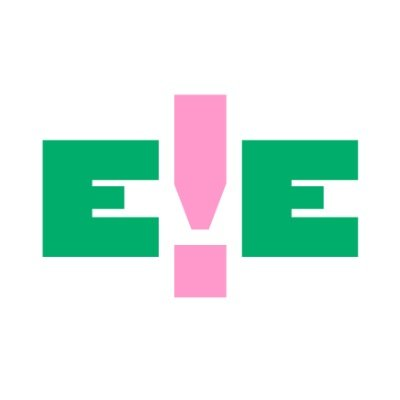
- Formation: 2 August 2022; 4 years ago
- Key people: Mick Lynch, Zarah Sultana, Dave Ward
- Website: wesayenough.co.uk

Enough is Enough was a British political campaign launched in 2022 that sought to pressure businesses and the United Kingdom Government into subsidising energy costs and increasing wages. The campaign was used as a left-wing policy platform backed by politicians, commentators and trade unions. The organisation's manifesto called for:

- A real pay rise
- A cut in energy bills
- An end to food poverty
- 'Decent' homes for all
- Higher tax for the wealthy
- Nationalisation of Certain Industries.

Mick Lynch, the National Union of Rail, Maritime and Transport Workers general is one of the organisation's leaders.

At their Autumn Conference in 2022, The Green Party of England and Wales voted to affiliate themselves with the Enough is Enough campaign.

== See also ==
- 2021–present United Kingdom cost-of-living crisis
