= Arthur J. Ragauskas =

American chemical engineer and biomass scientist

- Born: 1958 (age 67–68); United States
- Education: University of Western Ontario
- Known for: Lignocellulosic biomass conversion, lignin chemistry
- Awards: Fellow of the American Association for the Advancement of Science; Fellow of the International Academy of Wood Science
- Scientific career
- Fields: Chemical engineering, Biomass, Lignin, Biofuels
- Workplaces: Georgia Institute of Technology; University of Tennessee; Oak Ridge National Laboratory

Arthur J. Ragauskas (born 1958) is an American chemical engineer and biomass scientist. He is an elected fellow of the International Academy of Wood Science and the American Association for the Advancement of Science. Currently, he serves as a professor in the School of Chemical and Biomolecular Engineering at the Georgia Institute of Technology and holds a joint appointment with the University of Tennessee and Oak Ridge National Laboratory.

== Research career ==
Ragauskas earned his bachelor's degree in chemistry from the University of Western Ontario in 1980, and completed his PhD at the same university in 1985. His research specialized in physical organic chemistry with advanced nuclear magnetic resonance. He subsequently carried out postdoctoral training at the Natural Sciences and Engineering Research Council at the University of Alberta (1985–1986) and at Colorado State University (1986–1987). Later, he developed a research career focused on the chemistry and processing of renewable lignocellulosic materials.

At the Georgia Institute of Technology, he has worked on research programs integrating chemistry, materials science, and biotechnology. He also serves as a senior researcher associated with the BioEnergy Science Center and related U.S. Department of Energy initiatives at Oak Ridge National Laboratory.

Ragauskas has served on the editorial boards of journals, Biofuels, Bioproducts and Biorefining, Holzforschung, Frontiers in Energy Research -section Bioenergy and Biofuels, and Fuel Processing Technology.

== Recognition ==
Ragauskas has been elected a fellow of the American Association for the Advancement of Science and also, a fellow of the International Academy of Wood Science.

Until January 2026, the research work of Ragauskas has received more than 84,000 citations at Google Scholar.

== Selected publications ==
- Ragauskas, A. J.; Williams, C. K.; Davison, B. H. (21 January 2006). "The path forward for biofuels and biomaterials". Science. 311 (5760): 484–489. Bibcode:2006Sci...311..484R. doi:10.1126/science.1114736. PMID 16439654. (>7,300 citations)
- Ragauskas, A. J.; Beckham, G. T.; Biddy, M. J. (27 November 2014). "Lignin valorization: Improving lignin processing in the biorefinery". Science. 344 (6185) 1246843. doi:10.1126/science.1246843. PMID 24833396. (>4,500 citations)
