= Help-Link =

Help-Link UK Limited is a central heating firm in the United Kingdom.

== History ==
Help-Link was established in 1998 as a four person team based in East Leeds. It has since moved to larger premises in Castleford in 2003/4. The company's head office moved to Thorpe Park, Leeds as of May 2012. Over the last 15 years, Help-Link has grown to 1,000 employees nationwide.

== Harrogate Borough Council ==
Harrogate Borough Council have worked with Help-Link since 2002, supplying them with boiler installation and maintenance services. After the collapse of Connaught in September 2010, the company was asked to provide emergency repair and maintenance work. The contract included annual gas servicing and the provision of landlord safety certificates for 3,885 properties in the Harrogate district. As part of Harrogate Homeless Project (HHP), funded by the Government’s Places of Change "Programme" and Harrogate Borough Council, Help-Link renovated the Harrogate Homeless Project's accommodation building, enabling it to provide 16 single bedrooms, 11 toilets and eight shower rooms for its clients.

== Selby and Richmondshire District Councils ==
In 2010, Help-Link were awarded 3 1/2-year contracts for gas boiler service and general maintenance for Selby District Council, and "Richmondshire" District Council.

=== Government Warm Front Scheme ===
The Government Warm Front Scheme was re-launched in March 2011 under the UK Coalition Government to give financial assistance to homes struggling with bills to become more cost and energy efficient. Eligibility depends on income-related benefits and household efficiency to enable the least energy efficient homes to be prioritised. The Government provided up to £6,000 in grants in order to cut fuel poverty. Help-Link were selected as a certified agent to work on the behalf of the Warm Front Scheme, contracted as installation engineers to install and repair boilers to reduce the numbers of households with a sub-standard or broken boiler. The Warm Front Scheme closed at the end of 2012, with all outstanding jobs being completed by Help-Link within the early months of 2013.

== Affordable Warmth Scheme ==
Help-Link had been selected as a certified agent to work on the behalf of the Affordable Warmth scheme. They have been contracted for installation engineers to install and repair boilers and to reduce the number of households with inefficient, sub-standard boilers. The Scheme was launched in January 2013 and is designed to give financial assistance to homeowners that are struggling with fuel bills and have a low graded boiler. The Scheme aims to provide homeowners with more environmentally friendly boilers, and in turn-reduce fuel poverty. Eligibility for the scheme is based on a range of means tested government benefits that the customers is in receipt of.

== Advertising and sponsorship ==
Help-Link signed up veteran children's presenter Johnny Ball to star in their new television adverts, as well as signing a one-year deal with Rugby Football Super League team Castleford Tigers to become their main front shirt sponsor for the 2013 season. Help-Link was brought before the Advertising Standards Authority in 2006 after two listeners complained that the company's radio advert about the winter freeze was alarmist. The complaint was not upheld with the ASA stating it 'did not consider that it had over-emphasised the situation or went further than the media coverage' and was not in breach of ASA rules.

In October 2013, Help-Link announced they are the new secondary shirt sponsor of the rugby league club Leeds Rhinos; it was the most successful club in the Super League History. The sponsorship made Help-Link's name emblazoned on the reverse of the playing shirts, as well as on 25,000 replica shirts, pitch side boards at the ground and seen as a regular presence in the match day programme. The deal will mark the first time that any company has been the secondary shirt sponsor of both the Leeds Rhinos and Leeds United simultaneously.

== Miller Pattison purchase ==
The 24 April saw Help-Link's announcement of their latest venture in the acquisition of the loft and cavity insulation specialist Miller Pattison, formerly known as SIG Energy Management, from SIG PLC.

As part of the acquisition, which takes place a year since Help-Link received investment from private equity firm NorthEdge Capital, Help-Link will take on Miller Pattison’s network of 11 branches across the UK, their fleet of vehicles and 300 strong workforce.

== Homeserve acquisition ==
In 2017, Help-Link was acquired by emergency-repairs company Homeserve.
