= Priority Services Register =

In the United Kingdom, Priority Services Registers are maintained by gas, electricity and water utilities as a means of ensuring that vulnerable customers are protected. Registration is free.

Benefits of registration include availability of temporary supplies in the event of an outage, protection from bogus callers, and assistance with understanding and paying bills.

According to Yorkshire Water Services, households are eligible for registration where, for example:

- someone has limited mobility or cannot leave their home
- someone has communication difficulties such as with their sight, speech or hearing
- there is a person with a learning disability
- someone has dementia
- a family has a child under five years of age
- a person has difficulties with paying their bills.

In the gas and electricity markets, Priority Services Registers are maintained by the supply companies and distribution network operators, and their use is endorsed by Ofgem. Water companies operate Priority Services Registers in accordance with guidance issued by Ofwat. In the gas industry, the register has a statutory definition:

"Priority Service Register" means the register of certain domestic customers established and maintained by gas suppliers in accordance with the standard conditions of all gas supply licences granted or treated as granted under section 7A(1) of the Gas Act 1986.
