= National Energy Action =

UK charity

- Founded: 9 October 1984
- Type: Charitable organisation
- Registration no.: England and Wales: 01853927
- Purpose: Fuel Poverty; Energy Efficiency
- Location: West One, Forth Banks, Newcastle upon Tyne, NE1 3PA
- Coordinates: 54.965389°N 1.616031°W
- Key people: Adam Scorer (CEO)
- Revenue: £16.34 million (2018)
- Employees: 77 (2018)
- Website: www.nea.org.uk
- Formerly called: Neighbourhood Energy Action

National Energy Action (NEA) is a fuel poverty charity that works to eradicate fuel poverty and campaigns for greater investment in energy efficiency to help those who are poor or vulnerable gain affordable heat.

NEA has its headquarters in Newcastle upon Tyne and currently operates 20 demonstration projects at 10 offices in England and Wales. NEA has a separate office in Belfast which works throughout Northern Ireland and has two bases in Wales. NEA works closely with its sister organisation, Energy Action Scotland on fuel poverty in Scotland.

== NEA achieves its objectives through ==
Research and analysis into the causes and extent of fuel poverty and the development of policies which will address the problem.

Providing advice and guidance to installers on good practice in delivering energy efficiency services to low-income householders.

Developing national qualifications and managing their implementation to improve standards of practical work and the quality of energy advice.

Producing educational resources to teach people about the importance of energy efficiency.

Managing demonstration projects in inner cities and rural areas which show innovative ways of tackling fuel poverty and bring the wider benefits of energy efficiency to local communities.

The definition of affordable warmth in affordable warmth schemes is where a household can achieve temperatures needed to maintain health and comfort for expenditure of less than 10% of income. This definition has been accepted and used by successive Government Departments with responsibilities for fuel poverty issues to quantify the extent of the problem. However, there has been some disagreement over what constitutes household income and this clearly has considerable bearing on the total number of fuel-poor households.

The Government's preferred definition of household income includes Housing Benefit and Income Support for Mortgage Interest in the calculation of household resources, although fuel poverty estimates are also published using a formula that excludes housing subsidies.

NEA's view is that neither of these definitions is acceptable or rational and that the only sensible definition of income is one that uses actual disposable income after housing costs.

Fuel poverty results from a combination of low household income, unaffordable energy costs and inadequate thermal insulation and inefficient and uneconomic heating systems. Welfare benefit increases for vulnerable groups, and other initiatives such as the minimum wage, have addressed some aspects of general poverty and fuel poverty, this approach must be considered short term in the context of fuel poverty. NEA maintains that energy efficiency is the only rational solution to fuel poverty and that Government should direct.

== See also ==
- Energy efficiency in British housing
