= Carbon Emission Reduction Target =

United Kingdom government initiative

The Carbon Emission Reduction Target (CERT) in the United Kingdom (formerly the Energy Efficiency Commitment) is a target imposed on the gas and electricity transporters and suppliers under Section 33BC of the Gas Act 1986 and Section 41A of the Electricity Act 1989, as modified by the Climate Change and Sustainable Energy Act 2006

The original Energy Efficiency Commitment 1 (2002–2005) program required that all electricity and gas suppliers with 15,000 or more domestic customers must achieve a combined energy saving of 62 TWh by 2005 by assisting their customers to take energy-efficiency measures in their homes: suppliers had to achieve at least half of their energy savings in households on income-related benefits and tax credits.

In the second phase of the Energy Efficiency Commitment (2005–2008) scheme, energy saving targets were raised to 130 TWh suppliers, and here suppliers with at least 50,000 domestic customers (including affiliated licenses) were eligible for an obligation.

The third phase of CERT (previously known as Energy Efficiency Commitment 3) originally ran from 2008 to 2011 and increased the previous targets to 154 MtC. A consultation document was published alongside the 2007 Energy White Paper, and responses were invited by 15 August 2007. The new scheme is regulated by Electricity and Gas (Carbon Emissions Reduction) Order 2008 (S.I. 2008/188). In 2009 the UK Government increased the emission reduction target by a further 20% to 185 MtC. In 2010 the Government increased the target to 293 MtC, to be achieved over an extended period running until the end of 2012 (see The Electricity and Gas (Carbon Emissions Reduction) (Amendment) Order 2010: S.I.2010/1958).

From 2013 CERT will be superseded by the Energy Company Obligation (ECO)

== See also ==
- 10:10 (climate change campaign)
- Carbon governance in England
- Certified Emission Reduction (CER)
- Energy policy of the United Kingdom
- White certificate
