= Energy Company Obligation =

The Energy Company Obligation (ECO) is a British Government programme. It is designed to offset emissions created by energy company power stations. The first obligation period ran from 1 January 2013 to 31 March 2015. The second obligation period, known as ECO2, ran from 1 April 2015 to 31 March 2017. The third obligation period, known as ECO3, ran from 3 December 2018 until 31 March 2022. The fourth iteration, ECO4, commenced on 1 April 2022 and will run until 31 March 2026.

The Government requires the larger energy suppliers to help lower-income households improve their energy efficiency.

ECO is the replacement of two previous schemes, the Carbon Emission Reduction Target (CERT) and the Community Energy Saving Programme (CESP). The programme focused on heating, in particular improving insulation.

Ofgem has been appointed the scheme administrator on behalf of the Department for Energy Security & Net Zero.

The scheme has been plagued by poor workmanship in the installation of external wall insulation, leading to damp and mouldy homes, a report by the National Audit Office and a parliamentary investigation.

It was announced at the November 2025 United Kingdom budget that ECO would close on 31 March 2026.

== How does ECO work? ==
The ECO scheme works by placing an obligation on large and medium energy suppliers in England, Scotland and Wales to achieve a minimum level of energy bill savings in homes through energy efficiency installations. ECO is funded from consumer bills and aimed at low-income households in homes with poor energy efficiency ratings. Suppliers are allocated targets based on their overall share of the domestic gas and electricity market. Penalties are imposed if they fail to achieve their target.

Each obligation period is administered separately with its own end date. The threat of penalties if targets are not met leads to pressure to complete installations by a specified date, with corners cut and poor workmanship the result.

The range of measures available through the scheme include heating upgrades, solar panels, wall and roof insulation. The provision of these measures is supposedly designed to help vulnerable families reduce their energy bills. The scheme is also seen as a way of helping the government reach its net zero target by 2050.

== ECO3 target reached ==
Ofgem's ECO3 final determination report provides details on the overall performance of the scheme and conclusions regarding of energy suppliers’ achievement against their obligations. The overall target for all participant suppliers was an estimated lifetime bill savings of £8.253 billion. Ofgem's Final Determination Report for ECO3 confirms that this target was exceeded, with a total estimated lifetime bill savings of £8.457 billion achieved.

Other highlights were:

- All but one active supplier successfully met their HHCRO obligation and sub-obligation lifetime bill saving targets.
- 1.03 million energy saving measures were installed over the course of ECO3. This included:
  - Broken down or energy inefficient boilers being replaced in 251,741 households with energy efficient condensing boilers or low carbon heating alternatives
  - Cavity wall insulation installed in 152,938 households
  - Underfloor insulation installed in 133,173 households
  - Loft insulation installed in 88,588 households

== ECO4 ==
The latest iteration of the Energy Company Obligation (ECO4) began on 27 July 2022 and runs until 31 March 2026. Its goal is to improve the least energy-efficient properties and targets homes with an energy rating between D and G. It also aims to provide a more complete retrofit of properties to ensure maximum carbon emission savings. The eligibility criteria for ECO4 have changed to remove disability benefits. ECO4 qualifying benefits are income-based, some tax credits and pension credits.

Works are carried out by private companies, with funding from energy suppliers. Householders are recommended to check that installers are registered on the TrustMark website.

According to Ofgem's statistics, as of 7 May 2024 there had been a total of 100,708 ECO4 projects submitted. Statistics on energy supplier performance at 7 May 2024 can be viewed on the Energy Saving Genie website.

== Parliamentary Investigation ==
On 23 January 2025 the Government announced that it had identified widespread poor-quality installation of solid wall insulation under ECO4, suspended 39 companies from installing it and was requiring installers to rectify defects at their own expense. On 10 July 2025 the Public Accounts Committee opened an investigation into Faulty energy efficiency installations. On 14 October 2025 the National Audit Office published a report into Energy efficiency installations under the ECO, identifying poor-quality installations, their likely causes and suspected fraud.
