= Community Energy Saving Programme =

The Community Energy Saving Programme was an obligation on large UK energy companies to deliver energy saving measures to low income households. The obligation came into force on 1 September 2009 and ran until 31 December 2012. CESP was designed as a pilot for an area based obligation, and the subsequent Energy Company Obligation includes a more flexible area-based component, the Carbon Saving Communities Obligation.

Over 290,000 measures were delivered under CESP. Around half of these were forms of home insulation, and almost 40% were replacement boilers or heating controls provided with a new heating system.

The programme delivered carbon savings of 16.31 million tons of CO_{2}, 84.7% of the target. Progress was slow at first, and the majority of the savings were only achieved in the final six months of the three-year programme.

Three energy suppliers complied with their obligations under CESP: EDF Energy, E.ON and RWE npower. Meanwhile, British Gas, SSE and Scottish Power fell short, leaving Ofgem considering whether to impose a financial penalty. Four independent generators were also set targets, with which only Eggborough Power complied.
