= Household energy insecurity =

Household energy insecurity refers to a household's inability to meet its energy needs. Household energy insecurity is a broad framework that includes a household's inability to afford energy costs as one of several factors in a household's ability to meet energy needs. Household energy insecurity is influenced by both internal and external factors such as energy cost, household income, housing conditions, and personal behavior. The relevance of these factors may vary by geographic region, such as country or community, and the level of development of energy infrastructure. Household energy insecurity is sometimes referred to as fuel poverty or as a form of energy poverty.

== Terminology ==
When used in the context of developing countries, the term energy poverty is often used synonymously with household energy insecurity, i.e. the ability to afford energy within the home. In the context of developed countries, energy poverty more often refers to a lack of any access to modern energy infrastructure.

== Contributing factors ==
=== Relative energy cost ===
The cost of energy relative to household income impacts affordability of energy. Households are generally defined as energy burdened if energy costs exceed 10% of gross household income. In areas with more infrastructure and resources, households may face barriers to meeting energy needs due to the cost of purchasing, repairing, or maintaining equipment such as air conditioners or heating units as well as costs from running the equipment.

In areas with fewer infrastructure and resources, relative energy cost may impact type of fuel used, such as cheaper less efficient and more polluting fuels being used over more efficient and less polluting but costly fuels.

=== Housing conditions ===
Housing conditions such as household energy efficiency and the use of old or inefficient heating systems may impact energy insecurity. Energy insecure households are more likely to report poor insulation or drafts in their home such as from windows or doors, which may be more common in older or poorly maintained housing. Poorly insulated homes may have higher energy costs. Household energy efficiency improvements have also been associated with small but significant improvements in health.

=== Personal behavior ===
When faced with high energy costs, the concerns may influence energy-related behaviors at the household and individual levels. For example, households are forced to make a decision on what basic needs to sacrifice. A common decision low income households have to make is linked to food insecurity, known as the "heat or eat" dilemma, where a household sacrifices food in order to address the household energy concerns or vice versa. Also, households might try to reduce energy bills by reducing usage of energy systems by keeping their homes at temperatures that might either be too hot or cold.

=== Extreme temperatures and climate change ===
Energy needs are driven in part by heating and cooling. Climate change is shaping the distribution of outdoor temperatures both globally and locally - global trends include more frequent extreme hot temperatures and less frequent extreme cold temperatures, although there is regional variation. Hence, climate change is expected to shift the burden of energy demand from heating toward cooling, with regional variation on demand impacts.

== Impacts and mitigation ==
=== Health Effects ===
Energy is considered a basic necessity as it allows for access to heating, lighting and cooking. Energy is also required by some for medical reasons, such as refrigeration of medication or operation of equipment. Without this basic necessity it can lead to major health implications as studies have shown links with respiratory issues, mental health, and stress. There is an increased chance of environmental exposures to dampness, mold, and thermal discomfort. Women, children, and infants are most vulnerable to health effects caused by energy insecurity in low- and middle-income countries.

The inability to maintain a comfortable thermal environment may have implications, especially for some groups of people. For example, people taking certain medications, including chemotherapy used to treat cancer, may be especially sensitive to thermal conditions.

One alternative to heating and cooking as a result of energy insecurity, common in developing countries, is burning solid fuels. Death can be caused by smoky environments from inefficient stoves or from combustion of kerosene or coal for cooking. Around 600,000 lives are lost each year in Africa due to exposure of biomass smoke.

=== Mitigation ===
An unprecedented global energy crisis and significant rise in the cost of fossil fuels in 2022 caused many governments to try to shelter consumers from higher energy prices and to accelerate the transition to clean energy technologies. Renewable energy has great potential to reduce prices and dependence on fossil fuels in short and long term.

== Regional Analysis ==
Energy insecurity is a global problem with contributing factors that may vary in different communities and countries.

=== Household Energy Insecurity in developing countries ===
Household energy insecurity varies from region to region, there are differences between household energy insecurity for developed versus developing countries. Factors that can affect energy insecurity include income level, governance quality, trade openness, and foreign direct investment. Growing and urbanizing countries or regions, for example certain countries in Asia, are at a rapid increase in demand for energy which causes an increase in energy insecurity. With an increase in energy demand, solutions lie in developing new technology or relying on energy imports from other countries. While the goal is to be self-sufficient, the effort to bring in modern technology to provide sustainable energy will be outpaced by the demand as well as population growth.

While energy insecurity still focuses on energy access, it looks different in every country. In developed countries like the United States, we are examining households that miss bill payments, experience shut offs or live in housing with poor insulation. In developing countries such as some sub saharan African countries, we are focusing on any access or availability of reliable and clean energy. In developing countries, the availability and governance of energy is the main key compared to the issues such as low income and affordance in developed countries.

=== United States ===
The United States Energy Information Administration Residential Energy Consumption Survey (RECS) considers households to be energy insecure if they:

"have received a disconnection notice, have reduced or forgone basic necessities to pay energy bills, kept their houses at unsafe temperatures because of energy cost concerns, or been unable to repair heating or cooling equipment because of cost."

In the United States, low-income households spend an average of over 8% of gross income on energy costs and household below the federal poverty line spend over 16% of gross income, based on 2016 American Community Survey estimates of household energy consumption. In 2020, energy insecure households in the United States paid more for energy on average and per square foot than households not considered to be energy insecure.

==== Sociodemographics (US) ====
Studies done in the US, have proven that certain social characteristics and demographics are more likely to experience household energy insecurity than others. Some criteria to be considered energy insecure in the US include receiving a utility disconnection notice, experiencing a shutoff, or not being able to make a utility payment. Families most likely to be energy insecure are families 200% under the poverty line, have young children, or have no college degree. In terms of race, black and Hispanic families are most likely to experience energy insecurity.

==== Local efforts ====
- Maricopa County in Arizona established an Energy Insecurity workgroup in 2020.
- New York State has a Home Energy Assistance Program (HEAP). New York City developed a Get Cool program in 2020 that installed free air conditioning units for tens of thousands of low-income older adults. The city also provided millions of dollars in aid to hundreds of thousands of families to help pay for summer 2020 energy costs during the COVID-19 pandemic.

=== India ===
Households in India may face barriers to energy access due to a lack of available and affordable clean sources of energy. Costs for cooking and lighting can reach upwards of 20% of non-food expenditures in Indian households. Energy sources used may differ between rural versus urban communities. Cooking and heating with biomass fuels such as wood or dung is declining but is still fairly prevalent, contributing to household air pollution and is associated with negative health effects.

=== European Union ===
Nine percent of the EU population could not afford to heat their home sufficiently with Bulgaria scoring the highest of 39.2%.

Eurostat survey in 2016

=== United Kingdom ===
In the UK, fuel poverty is defined by the Warm Homes and Energy Conservation Act as: "a person is to be regarded as living "in fuel poverty" if he is a member of a household living on a lower income in a home which cannot be kept warm at reasonable cost". Statistically, this used to be defined as a household needing to spend more than 10% of its income to maintain an adequate heating regime. However, definitions of "income" and "adequate heating regime" vary between UK Government and Devolved Administrations. A new, more complex definition of fuel poverty is now used in the UK, based on the Hills review. This gave the following definition: fuel poverty is now defined as when a household's required fuel costs are above the median level, and if they were to spend what is required, then the household would be left with a residual income below the official poverty line. Additionally, a Fuel Poverty Indicator has been created, which shows how far into fuel poverty households are, not simply if they are in poverty or not.

Fuel poverty has been the focus of political action since the early 1970s. In early 2008 it was estimated by Energywatch that there were around 4.4 million households in fuel poverty in the UK, with just over 3 million in England alone: this was more than double the number in 2003. By April 2011 a YouGov survey indicated that the number of households in fuel poverty had risen to 6.3 million households, representing approximately 24% of all households in the UK.
