= 2021 Brighton bin strike =

Labour dispute in Brighton, England

- Part of the 2021–present UK cost-of-living crisis and UK industrial disputes and strikes (2022–present)
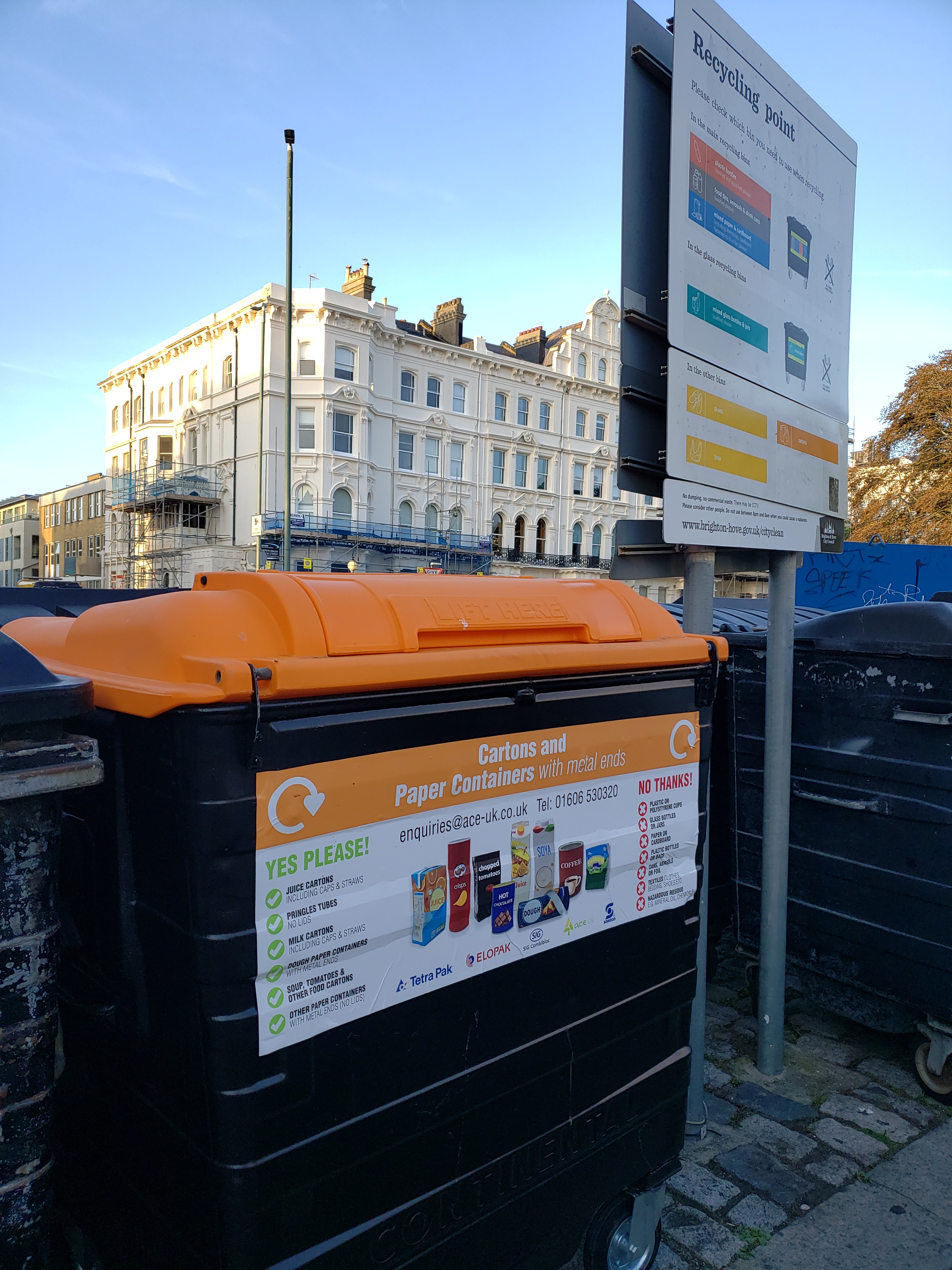
- A typical recycling bin in Brighton.
- Date: 21 September 2021 – 20 October 2021
- Location: Brighton and Hove
- Methods: Strikes

Parties
GMB	Brighton and Hove City Council

Lead figures
Gary Smith	Phélim Mac Cafferty

The 2021 Brighton bin strike was labour strike by bin workers in Brighton, East Sussex, England. The workers, represented by the GMB are striking in protest against changes of duties from the Brighton and Hove City Council. The strike was over by 20 October 2021. At the time of the ballot GMB stated that the action centred on the refusal of councillors to "intervene and settle an ongoing dispute around unilateral imposed daily changes and removal of drivers from long standing rounds without process, by management whim".

== Background ==
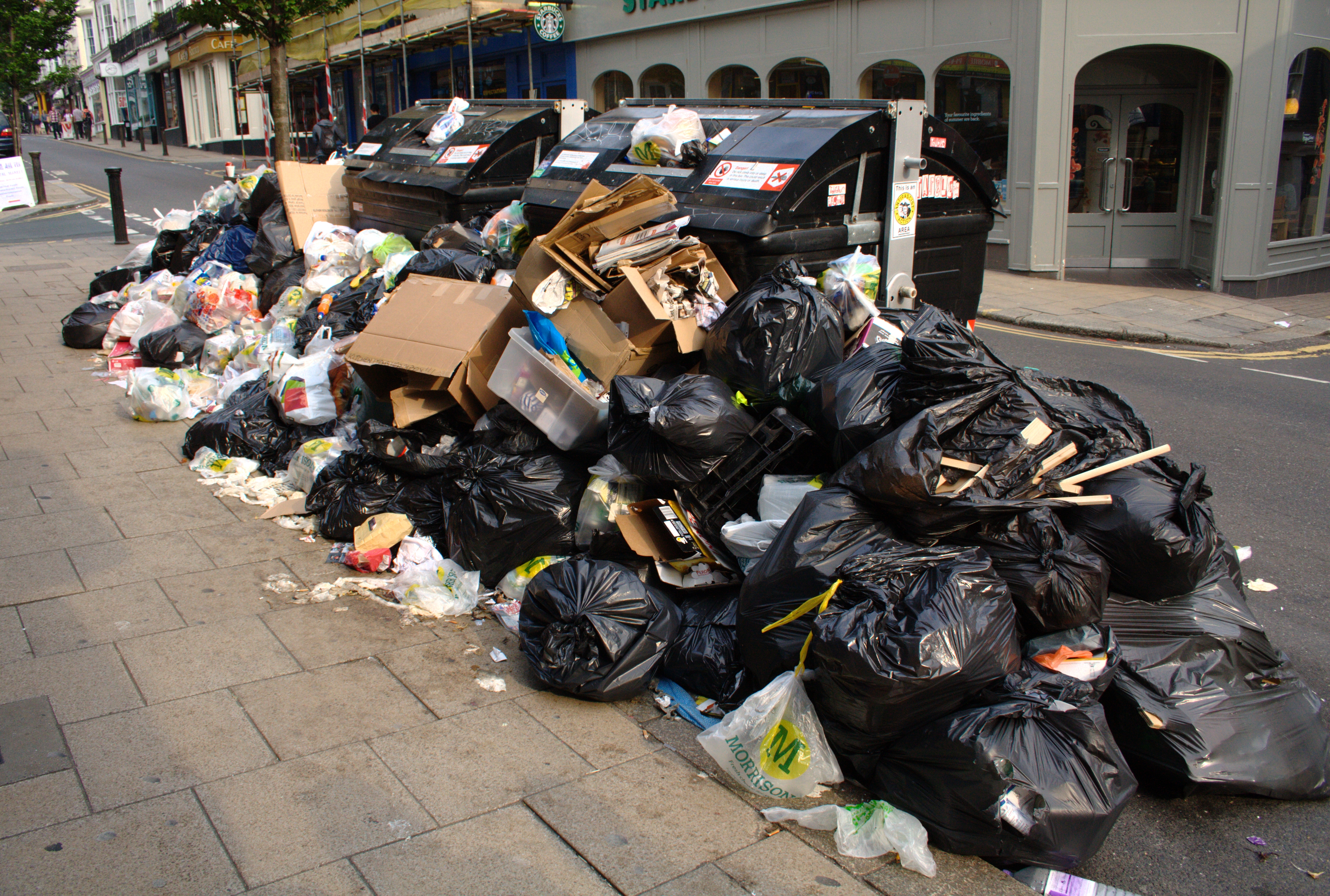
The bin strikes of Brighton in 2013.

Brighton and Hove had bin strikes in 2001, 2004, 2013 and 2014. Over the last 25 years, in addition to official strike action, there has been much unrest leading to 'wildcat' strikes and unofficial industrial action, including following the 'modernisation' plans introduced by the council in 2018

The strike action in 2021 falls between much unrest within Brighton and Hove City Council's City Clean department, both before and after the 2021 action. The fraught industrial relations have been the subject of much media attention over the years, including around the 2019 dispute when an independent investigation was undertaken.

== Strike ==
With a 79.6% turnout, the vote among the workers was unanimous in favour of striking. The strike would last for two weeks, until 18 October. On 5 October, the strike began, with the GMB releasing a statement saying that "constant one-sided enforced driver removals, changes of duties, crew variations and alterations in plans around the collection of dropped work has had a detrimental impact on the HGV driver's health and well-being at the city's Hollingdean Depot, and this very strong ballot outcome is a clear message to their employers that enough is enough."

On 6 October, the Labour councillors organised a meeting with the union. However, the union stated that nothing concrete had been agreed upon. That day, the council also stated that they would not be able to hire temporary bin workers to replace the strikers, both for legal reasons and due to the ongoing shortage of large goods vehicle-qualified drivers.

On 8 October, the union served notice for an additional two weeks of strikes, to begin on 21 October.

On 11 October, negotiations between the workers and the council broke down, with the council accusing the union of walking on talks without hearing the full details of the proposed offer. The union, however, stated that the offer had been lower than the previous offer. Controversy erupted after Conservative councillor Joe Miller proclaimed that "I hate to refer to Maggie Thatcher, but this is a similar situation - you can't negotiate with terrorists." After council leader Phélim Mac Cafferty denounced the comment as unacceptable, Miller withdrew it, but did not make a formal apology.

On 12 October, the union announced that the strike action would be paused for three days, from 18 to 21 October, before resuming. That day, deputy council chair Jamie Lloyd released a statement calling the build-up of waste on city pavements "an appalling situation" and said that meeting the union's requests would lead to "catastrophic cuts in other services."

On 13 October, the city council decided to call in an independent mediator if negotiations broke down. The GMB stated that it would not continue negotiating until the workers received a formal apology from Miller for his comments. The BBC further reported that the council had estimated that a pay raise would cost from £0.5m to £14.2m, mostly due to council staff in other departments demanding a similar pay raise.

On 16 October, the union released a statement saying that "we had an agreement at 6:25 last night but the chief exec and his team have taken that away."

On 17 October, the city council announced that it had hired private waste collectors to pick up bins, citing safety concerns, both due to the piles of rubbish blocking pedestrian pavements and due to a number of fires in communal bins having been reported in the city in the previous days.

In 2023, an independent KC report looked into unrest and bullying and harassment issues at Cityclean, they reported that in relation to the 2021 strike action:

A number of witnesses told me that this was triggered by attempts by City Clean management to performance manage a driver who was perceived as being strongly protected by GMB reps within the Council. Witnesses also told me that false claims were made that the driver involved had had a heart attack. The GMB Southern Region has advised that the formal notification relating to the dispute ‘did not relate to the (attempted or actual) performance management of one driver’. The ballot paper summarised the issues in dispute as relating to the Council’s alleged failure to follow policies and procedures ‘regarding HGV holding drivers, and resulting decision making around variations of duties, crew changes, planning for collecting of dropped work…’, a summary which is in my view consistent with the accounts of the witnesses referred to above."

== See also ==
- 2022 Scotland bin strikes
