= 2022 BT Group strikes =

2022 British Industrial Dispute

The 2022 BT Group strikes were an industrial dispute between the telecommunications provider BT and members of the Communication Workers Union over pay amongst the backdrop of the UK cost of living crisis. The strike action was taken by CWU members working for BT group's communications infrastructure subsidiary Openreach alongside those employed at the company's call centres.

== Overview ==
In April 2022, members of the Communication Workers Union rejected pay offers made by BT Group as part of its 2022 pay review which awarded a £1,500 increase in fully consolidated pay to its team members and frontline staff. The decision taken at the CWU's Telecoms and Financial Services conference was made on the basis that the offer failed to "adequately reward the contribution made by CWU members keeping the country connected throughout the pandemic" and that it was "not acceptable in the face of increased inflation ... and the cost of living crisis". The conference resolved to hold a ballot on undertaking industrial action as a result.

A strike ballot was held on the 30 June. Campaigning for a yes ballot took place, in one notable example the CWU erected billboards outside the BT Tower calling out a 32% increase in remuneration for BT Group CEO Philip Jansen, which it contrasted with the establishment of a "community pantry" at a BT call centre. BT claimed that this was "absolutely not a food bank", despite CWU claims to the contrary. A majority of both Openreach and BT Group staff turned out to vote in favour of strike action, though a strike ballot held by staff at BT owned mobile communications operator EE did not achieve the 50% turnout required by the Trade Union Act 2016, missing the 50% turnout threshold by 8 votes. This strike action took place on 29 July and 1 August, in the first nationwide strike taken by BT staff since 1987. Another two-day strike was held on 30 and 31 August. Additional strikes were also held on 6, 10, 20 and 24 October. Unlike in previous strikes, the CWU did not exempt 999 switchboard operators from partaking in October's industrial action. BT subsequently redeployed staff from other lines of business to answer 999 calls during the strike days.

On 28 November, union members accepted BT's offer of a £1,500 pay raise for workers earning less than £50,000, thus ending the year's industrial action.

== Response ==
In response to the notification of strike action made to BT Group, the company published a press release on 15 July in which it claimed that the pay offer it made awarded "team member and frontline colleagues the highest pay award in more than 20 years" and that "while we respect the choice of our colleagues who are CWU members to strike, we will work to minimise any disruption and keep our customers and the country connected".

On 1 August, shadow levelling up secretary Lisa Nandy joined CWU members on a picket line in her Wigan constituency, with shadow employment minister Imran Hussain and Labour whip Navendu Mishra also joining CWU picket lines. This is despite Labour Party leader Keir Starmer having previously told shadow ministers that they should not join picket lines during the 2022 United Kingdom railway strikes. Lisa Nandy is reported to have made Keir Starmer's office aware of her appearance on the picket line in advance of her visit.

== See also ==
- 2021–present United Kingdom cost-of-living crisis
- 2022–2023 United Kingdom industrial disputes and strikes
- 2022–2023 United Kingdom postal workers strikes
- 2022–2024 United Kingdom railway strikes
- 2021–2023 Stagecoach strikes
- 2022 British barristers' industrial action
- 2022 Scotland bin strikes
