= 2023 Brighton and Hove City Council election =

English local election

- 4 May 2023

All 54 council seats on Brighton and Hove City Council 28 seats needed for a majority
	First party	Second party	Third party
Party	Labour	Green	Conservative
Last election	20 seats, 32.5%	19 seats, 34.1%	14 seats, 21.0%
Seats before	16	20	11
Seats won	38	7	6
Seat change	▲18	▼12	▼8
	Fourth party	Fifth party
Party	Brighton and Hove Independents	Independent
Last election	New party	1 seat, 1.6%
Seats before	0	7
Seats won	2	1
Seat change	▲2	Steady
- 2023 Brighton City Council Election Map
Leader before election
Phélim Mac Cafferty
Green
No overall control
Leader after election
Bella Sankey
Labour

The 2023 Brighton and Hove City Council election took place on 4 May 2023 to elect members of Brighton and Hove City Council, England. This was at the same time as other local elections in England. Due to a boundary review, there was a change in ward boundaries, but the city council continued to comprise 54 members.

The council had been under no overall control prior to the election, being run by a Green minority administration led by Phélim Mac Cafferty. At this election Labour gained several extra seats to win an overall majority, whilst the Greens lost several seats, including Mac Cafferty's.

== Background ==
Results map of the 2019 election

The outcome of the 2019 election in the city saw the Labour Party form a minority administration, with support from the Green Party of England and Wales. This shifted following resignations and expulsions of councillors from the Labour Party, leading to the Green Party forming a minority administration instead, with their leader Phélim Mac Cafferty being appointed leader of the council in July 2020.

In 2022, the selection process in the major parties and political groupings in Brighton began. Of the 16 Labour councillors, 7 announced that they were standing down at the next election. This included the co-leaders of the Labour group, Carmen Appich and John Allcock, and previous leaders Nancy Platts and Daniel Yates.

In 2022, the Local Government Boundary Commission for England undertook a review of ward boundaries in the city. Following the review, there were 23 wards across the council, an increase of two, and only five wards remained the same. The overall number of seats on the council stayed the same at 54.

At the 2023 election Labour won a majority on the council for the first time since 1999. After the election, with the previous Labour leaders having not stood for re-election, the party selected Bella Sankey to be its new leader. She was formally appointed leader of the council at the subsequent annual council meeting on 25 May 2023.

== Summary ==
=== Pre-election composition ===
Party	Seats
Green Party of England and Wales	20
Labour Party	16
Conservative Party	11
Independents	7

=== Election result ===
2023 Brighton and Hove City Council election
Party	Candidates	Seats	Gains	Losses	Net gain/loss	Seats %	Votes %	Votes	+/−
Labour	54	38	18	0	+18	70.4	46.4	85,185	+11.8
Green	54	7	0	12	-12	13.0	26.5	48,570	-10.0
Conservative	50	6	0	8	-8	11.1	16.5	30,301	-9.4
Brighton and Hove Independents	9	2	1	0	1	3.7	4.2	7,779	N/A
Liberal Democrats	30	0	0	0	0	0.0	3.4	6,319	-0.4
Independent	13	1	1	0	1	1.9	2.2	4,067	+0.3
TUSC	8	0	0	0	0	0.0	0.5	922	N/A
UKIP	3	0	0	0	0	0.0	0.1	173	-0.9
Reform	1	0	0	0	0	0.0	0.1	127	N/A

== Ward results ==
Phélim Mac Cafferty and Hannah Allbrooke were sitting councillors for Brunswick and Adelaide ward.

=== Brunswick and Adelaide ===
Brunswick and Adelaide (2)
Party	Candidate	Votes	%	±%
Labour Co-op	Jilly Stevens	1,141	39.3	
Labour Co-op	Andrei Czolak	1,047	36.0	
Green	Hannah Allbrooke*	1,041	35.8	
Green	Phélim Mac Cafferty*	901	31.0	
Brighton and Hove Independents	Chris Woodley	550	18.9	
Independent	Dave Hall	266	9.2	
Conservative	Richard Latham	203	7.0	
Conservative	Keith Sharpe	162	5.6	
Liberal Democrats	Claire Lachlan	154	5.3	
TUSC	David Maples	79	2.7	
Turnout		2,905		
Labour win (new boundaries)				
Labour win (new boundaries)				

=== Central Hove ===
Central Hove (2)
Party	Candidate	Votes	%	±%
Labour Co-op	Emma Daniel	1,832	54.6	
Labour Co-op	Joy Robinson	1,710	50.9	
Green	Helen Dixon	988	29.4	
Green	Christopher Hawtree	730	21.7	
Conservative	Peter Goodman	419	12.5	
Conservative	Mark Watson	392	11.7	
Liberal Democrats	David Sears	193	5.7	
Independent	Nigel Furness	160	4.8	
TUSC	Glenn Kelly	93	2.8	
Turnout		3,358		
Labour win (new boundaries)				
Labour win (new boundaries)				

=== Coldean and Stanmer ===
Coldean and Stanmer (2)
Party	Candidate	Votes	%	±%
Labour	Mitchie Alexander	688	46.7	
Labour	Tobias Sheard	510	34.6	
Independent	Kate Knight	373	25.3	
Green	Laura Pizzolo	368	25.0	
Green	Martin Farley	352	23.9	
Conservative	Roz Rawcliffe	186	12.6	
Liberal Democrats	Jack Moxley	120	8.2	
TUSC	Penelope Iveson	76	5.2	
Liberal Democrats	Martin Wooller	59	4.0	
Turnout		1,472		
Labour win (new boundaries)				
Labour win (new boundaries)				

=== Goldsmid ===
Jackie O'Quinn was a sitting councillor for Goldsmid ward

Goldsmid (3)
Party	Candidate	Votes	%	±%
Labour	Birgit Miller	2,426	51.2	
Labour	Jackie O'Quinn*	2,421	51.1	
Labour	Trevor Muten	2,261	47.7	
Green	Rebecca Duffy	1,369	28.9	
Green	Ollie Sykes	1,211	25.5	
Green	Alexander Louis Sallons	1,085	22.9	
Conservative	Edward de Souza	498	10.5	
Brighton and Hove Independents	Linda Elisha	490	10.3	
Conservative	David Lewis	481	10.1	
Conservative	Mike Long	456	9.6	
Liberal Democrats	Andrew England	350	7.4	
Liberal Democrats	Paul Chandler	342	7.2	
Liberal Democrats	Owen Sharp	274	5.8	
Turnout		4,741		
Labour win (new boundaries)				
Labour win (new boundaries)				
Labour win (new boundaries)				

=== Hangleton and Knoll ===
Hangleton and Knoll (3)
Party	Candidate	Votes	%	±%
Labour Co-op	John Hewitt	2,501	52.5	
Labour Co-op	Amanda Grimshaw	2,490	52.2	
Labour Co-op	Faiza Baghoth	2,435	51.1	
Conservative	Dawn Barnett*	1,906	40.0	
Conservative	Nick Lewry*	1,629	34.2	
Conservative	Tim Hodges	1,582	33.2	
Green	Sarah Fitzgerald	360	7.6	
Green	Andrew Coleman	238	5.0	
Independent	Jamie Gillespie	211	4.4	
Green	Nigel Tart	169	3.5	
Reform	Ian Harris	127	2.7	
Turnout		4,767		
Labour gain from Conservative		Swing		
Labour gain from Conservative		Swing		
Labour gain from Conservative		Swing		

=== Hanover and Elm Grove ===
Steph Powell was a sitting councillor for Hanover & Elm Grove ward

Hanover and Elm Grove (3)
Party	Candidate	Votes	%	±%
Labour	Tim Rowkins	2,484	48.0	
Labour	Ty Galvin	2,453	47.4	
Labour	Maureen Winder	2,273	43.9	
Green	Fiona Wright	2,062	39.8	
Green	Wai Lee	1,999	38.6	
Green	Steph Powell*	1,887	36.4	
Brighton and Hove Independents	Bev Barstow	740	14.3	
Independent	Laura King	358	6.9	
Conservative	Susan Ellerton	189	3.7	
Liberal Democrats	Laura Mullin	161	3.1	
Conservative	Kenneth Mills	152	2.9	
Liberal Democrats	Samantha Waugh	139	2.7	
Conservative	Wayne Sturt	112	2.2	
Turnout		5,178		
Labour gain from Green		Swing		
Labour gain from Green		Swing		
Labour gain from Green		Swing		

=== Hollingdean and Fiveways ===
Siriol Hugh-Jones was a sitting councillor for Preston Park ward, Zoe John and Theresa Fowler in Hollingdean and Stanmer and Jamie Lloyd in Withdean.

Hollingdean and Fiveways (3)
Party	Candidate	Votes	%	±%
Labour	Theresa Fowler*	2,770	51.0	
Labour	Mohammed Asaduzzaman	2,643	48.7	
Labour	Bruno de Oliveira	2,540	46.8	
Green	Zoë John*	2,059	37.9	
Green	Siriol Hugh-Jones*	2,049	37.7	
Green	Jamie Lloyd*	1,674	30.8	
Conservative	Peter Revell	367	6.8	
Liberal Democrats	Ashley Ridley	338	6.2	
Conservative	Lesley Wilson	328	6.0	
Conservative	Janice Bates	321	5.9	
Independent	Gary Jones	306	5.6	
TUSC	Megan Churchland	167	3.1	
UKIP	Daniel Goodhand	108	2.0	
Turnout		5,431		
Labour win (new boundaries)				
Labour win (new boundaries)				
Labour win (new boundaries)				

=== Kemptown ===
Kemptown (2)
Party	Candidate	Votes	%	±%
Labour	Bharti Gajjar	1,794	50.7	
Labour	Gary Wilkinson	1,643	46.4	
Green	Lynn-Ora Knott	827	23.4	
Green	Ben Simmonds	739	20.9	
Brighton and Hove Independents	Alan Towler	514	14.5	
Conservative	Josephine O'Carroll	346	9.8	
Conservative	Ewan Clinch	343	9.7	
Liberal Democrats	Robert Brown	339	9.6	
Liberal Democrats	Dominique Hall	254	7.2	
Turnout		3,539		
Labour win (new boundaries)				
Labour win (new boundaries)				

=== Moulsecoomb and Bevendean ===
Amanda Evans was a sitting councillor for Queen's Park ward

Moulsecoomb and Bevendean (3)
Party	Candidate	Votes	%	±%
Labour	Amanda Evans*	2,033	67.1	
Labour	Ty Goddard	1,882	62.1	
Labour	Jacob Taylor	1,785	58.9	
Green	Frances Hunt	703	23.2	
Green	Anna Roberts	572	18.9	
Conservative	Gemma Powell	434	14.3	
Green	Ed Roberts	417	13.8	
TUSC	Julie Donovan	277	9.1	
Turnout		3,030		
Labour win (new boundaries)				
Labour win (new boundaries)				
Labour win (new boundaries)				

=== North Portslade ===
North Portslade (2)
Party	Candidate	Votes	%	±%
Independent	Peter Atkinson*	1,065	42.7	
Labour	Lucy Helliwell	1,045	41.9	
Labour	Alice Burton	959	38.4	
Conservative	Gary Taylor	473	19.0	
Independent	Anne Pissaridou*	459	18.4	
Conservative	Kirk Taylor	358	14.3	
Green	Debbie Shipton	128	5.1	
Green	Mike Dixon	88	3.5	
Liberal Democrats	Marjorie Leeds	87	3.5	
Turnout		2,495		
Independent gain from Labour		Swing		
Labour hold		Swing		

=== Patcham and Hollingbury ===
Patcham and Hollingbury (3)
Party	Candidate	Votes	%	±%
Conservative	Alistair McNair*	2,037	38.5	
Conservative	Anne Meadows*	1,821	34.4	
Conservative	Carol Theobald*	1,799	34.0	
Green	Sophie Broadbent	1,544	29.2	
Labour	Tyler Bennington-Poulter	1,417	26.8	
Labour	Benjamin Kent	1,366	25.8	
Green	Norma Fletcher	1,359	25.7	
Labour	Elizabeth Wheeler	1,359	25.7	
Green	Daniel Rue	1,307	24.7	
Brighton and Hove Independents	Paul Denyer	790	14.9	
Liberal Democrats	Caroline Brown	295	5.6	
Turnout		5,296		
Conservative win (new boundaries)				
Conservative win (new boundaries)				
Conservative win (new boundaries)				

=== Preston Park ===
Leo Littman was a sitting councillor for Preston Park ward and Steve Davis was a sitting councillor for Withdean.

Preston Park (3)
Party	Candidate	Votes	%	±%
Green	Steve Davis*	2,162	43.2	
Labour	Liz Loughran	2,139	42.7	
Green	Kerry Pickett	2,135	42.6	
Green	Leo Littman*	2,103	42.0	
Labour	Theresa Mackey	1,972	39.4	
Labour	David Messent	1,728	34.5	
Conservative	Lisa Watson	530	10.6	
Conservative	Hugh Robinson	474	9.5	
Conservative	Alex Wild	461	9.2	
Independent	Jan Turner	394	7.9	
Liberal Democrats	Hyder Khalil	381	7.6	
Turnout		5,008		
Green win (new boundaries)				
Labour win (new boundaries)				
Green win (new boundaries)				

=== Queen's Park ===
Clare Rainey was a sitting councillor for Queen's Park ward.

Queen's Park (2)
Party	Candidate	Votes	%	±%
Labour	Tristram Burden	1,822	58.4	
Labour	Chandni Mistry	1,702	54.6	
Green	Clare Rainey*	856	27.4	
Green	Mark Strong	682	21.9	
Brighton and Hove Independents	Adrian Hart	467	15.0	
Conservative	Martin Kenig	266	8.5	
Liberal Democrats	Thomas Osborne	163	5.2	
Turnout		3,119		
Labour win (new boundaries)				
Labour win (new boundaries)				

=== Regency ===
Regency (2)
Party	Candidate	Votes	%	±%
Green	Chloë Goldsmith	1,162	41.9	▼23.6
Labour	Alison Thomson	920	33.2	▲9.7
Green	Ricky Perrin	919	33.2	▼29.8
Labour	Peter Devonport	907	32.7	▲15.8
Liberal Democrats	Lawrence Eke	385	13.9	▲7.2
Brighton and Hove Independents	Gary Farmer	369	13.3	N/A
Liberal Democrats	Trevor Freeman	313	11.3	N/A
Conservative	Timothy Catt	232	8.4	▼2.9
Conservative	Robert Greenfield	190	6.9	▼2.5
Turnout		2,771		
Green hold		Swing		
Labour gain from Green		Swing		

=== Rottingdean and West Saltdean ===
Bridget Fishleigh was previously elected as an independent, but was re-elected as a member of the Brighton and Hove Independents.

Rottingdean and West Saltdean (2)
Party	Candidate	Votes	%	±%
Brighton and Hove Independents	Bridget Fishleigh*	2,266	52.9	
Brighton and Hove Independents	Mark Earthey	1,593	37.2	
Labour	Ron White	1,299	30.3	
Labour	Carole McIver-Wren	1,268	29.6	
Conservative	Daniel Harrison	552	12.9	
Conservative	Steven Smith	501	11.7	
Independent	Nigel Smith	327	7.6	
Green	Carol Bullock	203	4.7	
Green	Georgia Wrighton	142	3.3	
Liberal Democrats	Caroline Ellis	135	3.1	
TUSC	Ronald Reader	30	0.7	
Turnout		4,287		
BHI win (new boundaries)				
BHI win (new boundaries)				

=== Round Hill ===
Pete West was a sitting councillor for St Peter's and North Laine.

Round Hill (2)
Party	Candidate	Votes	%	±%
Green	Pete West*	1,408	52.9	
Green	Raphael Hill	1,383	52.0	
Labour	Most Ara	1,061	39.9	
Labour	Yassin Hassan	920	34.6	
Liberal Democrats	Matthew Davies	167	6.3	
Conservative	Tony Meadows	135	5.1	
Conservative	Clare Rogers	132	5.0	
Turnout		2,661		
Green win (new boundaries)				
Green win (new boundaries)				

=== South Portslade ===
South Portslade (2)
Party	Candidate	Votes	%	±%
Labour	Les Hamilton*	1,767	67.8	
Labour	Alan Robins*	1,589	61.0	
Conservative	Steve Harmer-Strange	365	14.0	
Green	Sally Cranfield	330	12.7	
Conservative	Aijuan Wang	291	11.2	
Liberal Democrats	Ken Rist	251	9.6	
Green	Danny Booth	216	8.3	
Independent	Helen Dear	204	7.8	
Turnout		2,605		
Labour hold		Swing		
Labour hold		Swing		

=== West Hill and North Laine ===
Sue Shanks was a sitting councillor for St Peter's and North Laine ward.

West Hill and North Laine (2)
Party	Candidate	Votes	%	±%
Green	Ellen McLeay	1,346	51.0	
Green	Sue Shanks*	1,256	47.6	
Labour	Tom Chatfield	928	35.2	
Labour	John Cooper	905	34.3	
Conservative	Katherine Janio	206	7.8	
Conservative	Linda Murray	197	7.5	
Liberal Democrats	Rob Heale	187	7.1	
Liberal Democrats	Anthony Seymour	145	5.5	
Turnout		2,637		
Green win (new boundaries)				
Green win (new boundaries)				

=== Westbourne and Poets' Corner ===
Westbourne and Poets' Corner (2)
Party	Candidate	Votes	%	±%
Labour Co-op	Julie Cattell	1,911	56.5	
Labour Co-op	Leslie Pumm	1,741	51.5	
Green	Renato Marques	743	22.0	
Green	Geoff Shanks	691	20.4	
Conservative	Michael Bates	448	13.3	
Conservative	Mark Clayton	421	12.5	
Independent	James Verguson	211	6.2	
Liberal Democrats	Geoff Date	208	6.2	
TUSC	Dave Hill	111	3.3	
UKIP	Patricia Mountain	65	1.9	
Turnout		3,381		
Labour win (new boundaries)				
Labour win (new boundaries)				

=== Westdene and Hove Park ===
Samer Bagaeen was a sitting councillor in the former Hove Park ward.

Westdene and Hove Park (3)
Party	Candidate	Votes	%	±%
Conservative	Samer Bagaeen*	2,246	41.9	
Conservative	Emma Hogan	2,237	41.7	
Conservative	Ivan Lyons	2,181	40.7	
Labour	Lundy Mackenzie	2,081	38.8	
Labour	Warren Morgan	2,040	38.0	
Labour	Ben Philipsborn	1,881	35.1	
Green	Melanie Poots	819	15.3	
Green	Jake Sharpstone	605	11.3	
Green	Steve Griffiths	584	10.9	
Liberal Democrats	Carolyn Dunn	356	6.6	
Liberal Democrats	Andrew Harrison	289	5.4	
Liberal Democrats	Simon Jardine	279	5.2	
Turnout		5,363		
Conservative win (new boundaries)				
Conservative win (new boundaries)				
Conservative win (new boundaries)				

=== Whitehawk and Marina ===
Whitehawk and Marina (2)
Party	Candidate	Votes	%	±%
Labour	David McGregor	1,366	54.1	
Labour	Gill Williams	1,330	52.7	
Conservative	Paul Wood	642	25.4	
Conservative	Robb Young	600	23.8	
Green	Aditi Bhonagiri	385	15.2	
Green	Mat Sunderland	219	8.7	
Liberal Democrats	Stewart Stone	206	8.2	
TUSC	Bill North	89	3.5	
Turnout		2,525		
Labour win (new boundaries)				
Labour win (new boundaries)				

=== Wish ===
Wish (2)
Party	Candidate	Votes	%	±%
Labour	Bella Sankey	2,216	65.0	+30.9
Labour	Paul Nann	2,062	60.5	+30.9
Conservative	Benjamin Franks	747	21.9	−19.1
Conservative	Paul Tanner	705	20.7	−17.3
Green	Sharon Hamlin	267	7.8	−18.2
Independent	Georgia McKinley-Fitch	209	6.1	+6.1
Green	Guy Davidson	163	4.8	−9.1
Liberal Democrats	Stamati Crook	161	4.7	−2.3
UKIP	John Gartside	49	1.4	−1.8
Turnout		3,408		
Labour win (new boundaries)				
Labour win (new boundaries)				

=== Woodingdean ===
Steve Bell and Dee Simson were sitting councillors for Woodingdean ward.

Woodingdean (2)
Party	Candidate	Votes	%	±%
Labour	Jacob Allen	1,581	50.2	+8.9
Labour	Jacqui Simon	1,551	49.2	+11.7
Conservative	Dee Simson*	1,322	42.0	−4.2
Conservative	Steve Bell*	1,275	40.5	−2.2
Green	Geraldine Keenan	162	5.1	−8.1
Green	Luke Walker	104	3.3	−6.6
Liberal Democrats	Ian Newman	102	3.2	+3.2
Turnout		3,150		
Labour gain from Conservative		Swing		
Labour gain from Conservative		Swing		

== Changes 2023–2027 ==
- Samer Bagaeen, elected as a Conservative councillor, left the party in April 2024 to sit as an independent.
- Bruno De Oliveira, elected as a Labour councillor, left the party in February 2025 to sit as an independent.
- Ty Galvin, elected as a Labour councillor, was suspended from the party in November 2025 and chose to sit as an independent.
- Bruno De Oliveira, previously an independent and Labour councillor, joined the Green Party in January 2026.
- Birgit Miller, elected as a Labour councillor, left the party in August 2026 to sit as an independent.

=== By-Elections ===
==== South Portslade ====
The South Portslade by-election followed the resignation of Labour councillor Les Hamilton.

South Portslade by-election, 11 January 2024
Party	Candidate	Votes	%	±%
Labour	Josh Guilmant	874	54.6	▼6.0
Conservative	Benjamin Franks	246	15.4	▼2.9
Liberal Democrats	Kenneth Rist	186	11.6	▲3.0
Green	Danny Booth	149	9.3	▼2.0
TUSC	David Maples	53	3.3	N/A
Democratic Liberation Party	Georgia McKinley-Fitch	49	3.1	N/A
Independent	Jamie Gillespie	44	2.7	N/A
Majority		628	39.2	
Turnout		1,601		
Labour hold		Swing		

==== Queen's Park (2024) ====
The Queen's Park by-election followed the resignation of Labour councillor Chandni Mistry.

Queen’s Park by-election, 2 May 2024
Party	Candidate	Votes	%	±%
Labour	Milla Gauge	1,241	46.1	▼12.3
Green	Luke Walker	766	28.4	▲1.1
Brighton and Hove Independents	Adrian Hart	449	16.6	▲1.6
Conservative	Sunny Choudhury	168	6.2	▼2.3
Liberal Democrats	Dominique Hall	67	2.4	▼2.8
Majority		448	16.5	
Turnout		2,718	38.94	
Labour hold		Swing		

==== Kemptown ====
The Kemptown by-election followed the resignation of Labour councillor Bharti Gajjar.

Kemptown by-election, 2 May 2024
Party	Candidate	Votes	%	±%
Labour	Théresa Mackey	1,382	45.8	▼4.9
Green	Ricky Perrin	590	19.5	▼3.9
Liberal Democrats	Robert Brown	406	13.4	▲3.8
Brighton and Hove Independents	Gary Farmer	369	12.2	▼2.3
Conservative	Josephine O’Carroll	222	7.4	▼2.4
Independent	Jamie Gillespie	44	1.5	N/A
Majority		792	26.3	
Turnout		3,013	34.8	
Labour hold		Swing		

==== Brunswick and Adelaide ====
The Brunswick and Adelaide by-election followed the resignation of Labour councillor Jilly Stevens due to ill health.

Brunswick and Adelaide by-election, 4 July 2024
Party	Candidate	Votes	%	±%
Green	Ollie Sykes	2,193	42.7	▲7.4
Labour	Alice Burton	1,873	36.4	▼13.9
Brighton and Hove Independents	Chris Woodley	588	11.4	▲1.4
Liberal Democrats	Claire Lachlan	389	7.6	▲4.1
Independent	Jamie Gillespie	98	1.9	N/A
Majority				
Turnout			65.14	
Green gain from Labour		Swing	10.7	

==== Westbourne & Poets' Corner ====
The Westbourne & Poets' Corner by-election followed the resignation of Labour councillor Leslie Pumm due to health reasons.

Westbourne & Poets' Corner by-election, 1 May 2025
Party	Candidate	Votes	%	±%
Labour	Sam Parrott	894	32.5	▼19.2
Green	Geoff Shanks	685	24.9	▲4.8
Liberal Democrats	Michael Wang	598	21.7	▲16.1
Reform	Gary Farmer	258	9.4	N/A
Conservative	Tony Meadows	129	4.7	▼8.4
Democratic Liberation Party	Georgia McKinley-Fitch	93	3.4	N/A
TUSC	David Maples	91	3.3	N/A
Independent	Keith Jago	7	0.3	N/A
Majority		209		
Turnout			36.95	
Labour hold		Swing		

==== Queen's Park (2025) ====
The Queen's Park by-election followed the resignation of Labour councillor Tristram Burden, whose new role as a local authority inspector for the Care Quality Commission created a conflict of interest.

Queen's Park by-election, 18 September 2025
Party	Candidate	Votes	%	±%
Green	Marina Lademacher	1,133	48.4	▲19.9
Labour	Simon Charleton	729	31.1	▼15.0
Reform	John Shepherd	237	10.1	N/A
Liberal Democrats	Rüdi Dikty-Daudiyan	98	4.2	▲1.7
Conservative	Sunny Choudhury	82	3.5	▼2.7
Independent	Adrian Hart	64	2.7	N/A
Majority		404	17.3	
Turnout		2,343	33.3	
Green gain from Labour		Swing	17.5	

==== Goldsmid ====
The Goldsmid by-election followed the resignation of Labour councillor Jackie O'Quinn, a former mayor who left the Labour Party over policy disagreements and subsequently resigned from the council.

Goldsmid by-election, 25 June 2026
Party	Candidate	Votes	%	±%
Green	Nadia Barton Ahmad	2,037	49.0	▲22.4
Labour	Philip Berman	1,357	32.7	▼14.6
Reform	Luke Willmoth	304	7.3	N/A
Liberal Democrats	Kim Leyland-Walker	214	5.2	▼1.7
Conservative	Louis Bird	210	5.1	▼4.6
Trade Union and Socialist Coalition	Glenn Kelly	31	0.7	N/A
Majority		680	16.3	
Turnout		4,156	35.8	
Green gain from Labour		Swing	18.5	

==== Queen's Park (2026) ====
The by-election was triggered by the resignation of Labour councillor Milla Gauge, who cited ignorance regarding safeguarding concerns as the reason for her resignation. Gauge herself was elected in a by-election for Queen's Park ward on 2nd May 2024.

Queen's Park by-election, 24 September 2026
Party	Candidate	Votes	%	±%
Green	Mark Strong	1,139	50.1	+26.2
Labour	Steve Gladwin	802	35.3	−15.7
Reform	John Shepherd	160	7.0	New
Conservative	Stefan Speckesser	97	4.3	−3.2
Liberal Democrats	Rudi Dikty-Daudiyan	74	3.3	−1.3
Majority		337	14.8	N/A
Rejected ballots		9	0.4	
Turnout		2,281	33.4	−12.3
Green gain from Labour		Swing		
