= 2022 Scotland bin strikes =

Scottish strike action

- Part of the 2021–present UK cost-of-living crisis and UK industrial disputes and strikes (2022–present)
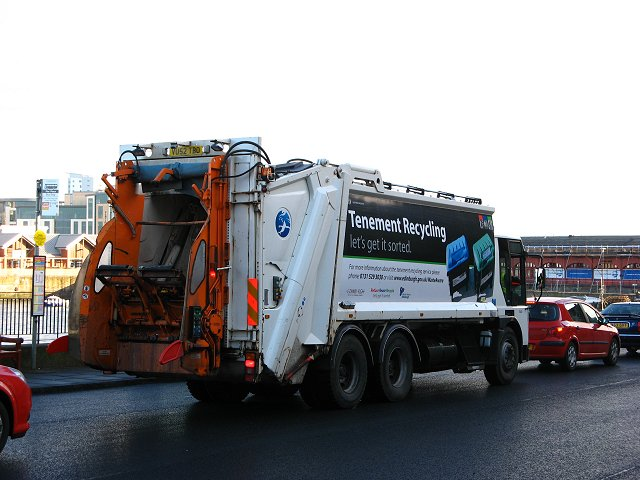
- A typical bin lorry in Edinburgh.
- Date: 18 August 2022 – 2 September 2022
- Location: Scotland
- Methods: Strikes

Parties
GMB	Scottish government

Lead figures
Gary Smith	Nicola Sturgeon

The 2022 Scotland bin strike was a labour strike by bin workers across Scotland. The workers, represented by the GMB were striking for a pay rise to match that being given to local government workers in the rest of the UK. The strikes began in Edinburgh but spread to other parts of Scotland, affecting 20 of Scotland's 32 council areas.

== Events ==
On 18 August, and following a pay dispute with Convention of Scottish Local Authorities (COSLA), refuse workers belonging to the Unison, Unite and GMB trade unions launched industrial action in Edinburgh. The 12-day strike began as the city played host to the 2022 Edinburgh Festival. The walkout ended at 04:59 on 30 August. The trade unions stated the main reason for strike was due to the UK cost of living crisis.

Residents in Edinburgh were told by Edinburgh City Council to keep all rubbish indoors.

On 29 August, GMB rejected the offer proposed by the Convention of Scottish Local Authorities. According to the Scottish Government, the deal included a payment of at least £1,925 for council staff, with those earning £20,000 receiving £2,000.

On 1 September, First Minister of Scotland Nicola Sturgeon met with council leaders and trade union leaders to resolve the dispute. On 2 September, the strikes were called off by the three unions involved after a 10% pay deal was agreed upon. Sturgeon had previously been criticised for attending Edinburgh Festival events while the strike was ongoing.

== Health warning ==
A health warning was declared by Public Health Scotland due to the build-up of rubbish in urban areas. They also called on local authorities to deep clean public areas.

== See also ==
- 2021 Brighton bin strike
- 2018–2023 United Kingdom higher education strikes
