= 2007 Brighton and Hove City Council election =

2007 UK local government election

- 3 May 2007

All 54 council seats 28 seats needed for a majority
	First party	Second party
Party	Conservative	Labour
Last election	20	23
Seats won	26	13
Seat change	▲6	▼10
Popular vote	28,444	20,331
Percentage	34.58%	24.72%
Swing	▲0.09%	▼7.64%
	Third party	Fourth party
Party	Green	Liberal Democrats
Last election	6	3
Seats won	12	2
Seat change	▲6	▼1
Popular vote	17,046	8,686
Percentage	20.72%	10.56%
Swing	▲4.14%	▼4.57%
- Map of results of 2007 election
Previous Largest Party before election
Labour
Subsequent Largest Party
Conservative

Elections to Brighton and Hove City Council on the south coast of England were held on 3 May 2007. The whole council (a unitary authority) was up for election and all 54 councillors were elected.

The Conservative Party won 26 out of 54 seats on the council, replacing the Labour Party as the largest party and formed a minority administration. This result was to some extent in line with the general pattern of results throughout England that day, with Conservatives gaining seats at the expense of Labour and the Liberal Democrats. The Green Party increased its number of seats from 6 to 12.

Following the election, the composition of the council was as follows:

Party	Seats	±
Conservative	26	+6
Labour	13	-10
Green Party	12	+6
Liberal Democrat	2	–1
Independent	1	–1

== Election result ==
Brighton & Hove Election Result 2007
Party	Seats	Gains	Losses	Net gain/loss	Seats %	Votes %	Votes	+/−
Conservative	26	6	0	6	48.15	34.58	28,444	+0.09
Labour Co-op	13	0	10	-10	24.07	24.72	20,331	-7.64
Green	12	6	0	6	22.22	20.72	17,046	+4.14
Liberal Democrats	2	0	1	-1	3.70	10.56	8,686	-4.57
Independent	1	0	1	-1	1.85	5.32	4,378	+3.84
Brighton and Hove Independents	0	0	0	0	0	1.88	1,545	N/A
Respect	0	0	0	0	0	0.78	643	N/A
Protest Vote	0	0	0	0	0	0.41	338	N/A
UKIP	0	0	0	0	0	0.35	291	+0.26
Alliance for Green Socialism	0	0	0	0	0	0.28	232	N/A
Socialist	0	0	0	0	0	0.19	159	N/A
Socialist Labour	0	0	0	0	0	0.13	109	-0.03
English Democrat	0	0	0	0	0	0.07	56	N/A

== Ward results ==
=== Brunswick and Adelaide ===
Brunswick & Adelaide (2)
Party	Candidate	Votes	%	±%
Liberal Democrats	Paul Elgood	942	23.18	−6.22
Liberal Democrats	David Watkins	729	17.94	−8.90
Green	Phélim Mac Cafferty	482	11.86	+4.86
Green	Hazel Ellison	431	10.61	+10.61
Conservative	Joanne Heard	368	9.06	+2.59
Conservative	Roz Rawcliffe	357	8.78	+2.38
Labour Co-op	David Boyle	284	6.99	−7.98
Labour Co-op	Simon Gulliver	263	6.47	−6.57
Independent	Brian Ralfe	152	3.74	N/A
English Democrat	Ben Potter	56	1.38	N/A
Turnout		3,335	28.0	−5
Liberal Democrats hold		Swing		
Liberal Democrats hold		Swing		

=== Central Hove ===
Central Hove (2)
Party	Candidate	Votes	%	±%
Conservative	Averil Older	964	20.48	+0.84
Conservative	Jan Young	901	19.14	+0.04
Liberal Democrats	Simon Doyle	692	14.70	−1.20
Liberal Democrats	Benjamin Herbert	667	14.17	−1.06
Green	Dave Walsh	420	8.92	+3.04
Green	Jacqueline Da Costa	333	7.07	+1.84
Labour Co-op	Rachel Lyons	317	6.73	−3.05
Labour Co-op	Bernie Katz	304	6.46	−2.77
Protest Vote	Christopher Kilburn	109	2.32	N/A
Turnout		4,707	34.0	−7.58
Conservative hold		Swing		
Conservative hold		Swing		

=== East Brighton ===
East Brighton (3)
Party	Candidate	Votes	%	±%
Labour Co-op	Gill Mitchell	1,539	15.78	+1.66
Labour Co-op	Warren Morgan	1,401	13.73	+0.47
Labour Co-op	Craig Turton	1,262	12.36	+1.18
Conservative	Simon Hackett	1,000	9.80	+0.09
Conservative	Victor Mower	997	9.77	+0.47
Conservative	David Van Day	931	9.12	+0.20
Green	Nigel Tart	621	6.08	+0.39
Green	Eliza Fakhr	467	4.58	+0.24
Green	Hugh Miller	445	4.36	+0.74
Liberal Democrats	James Ledward	401	3.93	−3.11
Liberal Democrats	Tim Hodlin	400	3.92	−2.31
Liberal Democrats	Trefor Hunter	377	3.69	−1.36
Brighton and Hove Independents	Vicki Davies	257	2.52	N/A
Socialist Labour	John McLeod	109	1.07	−0.46
Turnout		10,207	35.4	−3.2
Labour Co-op hold		Swing		
Labour Co-op hold		Swing		
Labour Co-op hold		Swing		

=== Goldsmid ===
Goldsmid (3)
Party	Candidate	Votes	%	±%
Conservative	Paul Lainchbury	1,330	10.67	−0.25
Conservative	Ayas Fallon-Khan	1,238	9.93	−0.52
Labour Co-op	Melanie Davis	1,231	9.87	−0.86
Labour Co-op	Vince Meegan	1,201	9.63	−1.07
Conservative	Stephen Wade	1,189	9.54	−0.88
Labour Co-op	Alun Jones	1,098	8.81	−1.69
Green	Rob Jarrett	1,010	8.10	+1.77
Green	Martin Grimshaw	833	6.68	+2.13
Green	Sue Baumgardt	760	6.10	+2.22
Liberal Democrats	Bob Bailey	720	5.77	−2.13
Liberal Democrats	Andrew Mailing	609	4.88	−2.44
Liberal Democrats	Stephen Potts	506	4.06	−2.24
Brighton and Hove Independents	Anne Giebeler	314	2.52	N/A
Independent	Gemma Furness	134	1.07	N/A
Independent	Nigel Furness	114	0.91	N/A
Brighton and Hove Independents	David Jeal	109	0.87	N/A
Independent	Peter Poole	73	0.59	N/A
Turnout		12,469	37.5	−6.2
Conservative hold		Swing		
Conservative gain from Labour Co-op		Swing		
Labour Co-op hold		Swing		

=== Hangleton and Knoll ===
Hangleton & Knoll (3)
Party	Candidate	Votes	%	±%
Conservative	Dawn Barnett	2,651	18.73	+4.88
Conservative	Tony Janio	2,237	15.80	+1.15
Conservative	David Smart	2,215	15.65	+2.95
Labour Co-op	Brian Fitch	1,820	12.86	−2.39
Labour Co-op	Tony Meadows	1,514	10.70	−3.62
Labour Co-op	Eddy Sears	1,509	10.66	−2.35
Liberal Democrats	David Patrick	335	2.37	−0.48
Green	Andy Player	321	2.27	−0.41
Respect	Maggie Clifford	297	2.10	+0.84
UKIP	Stuart Bower	291	2.06	N/A
Liberal Democrats	David Sears	261	1.84	−1.25
Green	Tim Goodall	255	1.80	+0.18
Green	Nicola Hodgson	251	1.77	+0.53
Liberal Democrats	Lee Shingles	198	1.40	−1.20
Turnout		14,155	45.6	−10.7
Conservative hold		Swing		
Conservative gain from Labour Co-op		Swing		
Conservative gain from Labour Co-op		Swing		

=== Hanover and Elm Grove ===
Hanover & Elm Grove (3)
Party	Candidate	Votes	%	±%
Green	Bill Randall	2,182	18.61	+2.56
Green	Georgia Wrighton	2,102	17.93	+4.09
Green	Vicky Wakefield-Jarrett	1,945	16.59	+6.50
Labour Co-op	Joyce Edmond-Smith	1,321	11.27	−2.50
Labour Co-op	Leo Barraclough	1,030	8.78	−3.79
Labour Co-op	Brendan Hanlon	945	8.06	−2.97
Conservative	James Mortimer	482	4.11	+0.54
Conservative	Guy Gilmour	459	3.91	+0.51
Conservative	Luke Foster	411	3.51	+0.19
Liberal Democrats	Matthew Barker	333	2.84	−0.93
Liberal Democrats	Ellen Woolley	260	2.22	−1.14
Liberal Democrats	Beulah Town	256	2.18	−1.11
Turnout		11,466	36.6	−8.2
Green hold		Swing		
Green hold		Swing		
Green gain from Labour Co-op		Swing		

=== Hollingdean and Stanmer (until 2008 known as Hollingbury and Stanmer) ===
Hollingbury and Stanmer (3)
Party	Candidate	Votes	%	±%
Labour Co-op	Jeane Lepper	1,326	15.10	−1.26
Labour Co-op	Christine Simpson	1,056	12.02	−2.59
Labour Co-op	Patricia Hawkes	1,049	11.94	−2.94
Conservative	Carol Ramsden	838	9.54	+0.79
Conservative	Nick Garside	832	9.47	+0.98
Conservative	Karen Miles	825	9.39	+1.44
Green	Tom Druitt	685	7.80	+1.98
Green	Amelia Mills	561	6.39	+2.23
Green	Guy Richardson	426	4.85	+1.90
Independent	Nick Savvides	408	4.65	N/A
Liberal Democrats	Vanessa Blackwell	381	4.34	+0.04
Liberal Democrats	Trevor Freeman	285	3.25	−0.72
Liberal Democrats	John Riddington	267	3.04	−0.22
Alliance for Green Socialism	Tony Greenstein	232	2.64	−0.22
Socialist	Andrew Clarke	159	1.81	N/A
Socialist	Phillip Clarke	137	1.56	N/A
Turnout		9,467	30.63	−7.28
Labour Co-op hold		Swing		
Labour Co-op hold		Swing		
Labour Co-op hold		Swing		

=== Hove Park (until 2009 known as Stanford) ===
Stanford (2)
Party	Candidate	Votes	%	±%
Conservative	Vanessa Brown	2,357	31.80	+0.41
Independent	Jayne Bennett	2,250	30.35	+8.08
Conservative	Michael Switzer	1,514	20.42	−0.95
Green	Mike Butler	302	4.07	+1.04
Labour Co-op	Jacqueline Teeboon	277	3.74	−2.13
Labour Co-op	Lisa Buckingham	234	3.16	−2.32
Liberal Democrats	Roy Alldred	209	2.82	−2.42
Green	Liz Petty	137	1.85	−0.04
Liberal Democrats	Jo Lake	133	1.79	−1.67
Turnout		4,010	50.43	−5.51
Conservative hold		Swing		
Independent hold		Swing		

=== Moulsecoomb and Bevendean ===
Moulsecoomb and Bevendean (3)
Party	Candidate	Votes	%	±%
Labour Co-op	Mo Marsh	1,018	12.52	−2.96
Labour Co-op	Anne Meadows	1,018	12.52	−2.73
Conservative	Maria Caulfield	984	12.10	+3.40
Conservative	Mel Grundy	983	12.09	+3.66
Conservative	Elizabeth Kirby	964	11.85	+3.54
Labour	Lis Telcs	848	10.43	−4.80
Green	Matt Dunton	468	5.76	+0.73
Green	Barry Mills	357	4.39	+0.67
Respect	David Bangs	346	4.25	N/A
Green	Morgan Daniels-Yeoman	333	4.09	+1.09
Liberal Democrats	Richard Bowden	320	3.94	−1.79
Liberal Democrats	Paul Chandler	268	3.30	−1.36
Liberal Democrats	Bruce Neave	225	2.77	−1.85
Turnout		2,949	27.18	−9.73
Labour Co-op hold		Swing		
Labour Co-op hold		Swing		
Conservative gain from Labour Co-op		Swing		

=== North Portslade ===
North Portslade (2)
Party	Candidate	Votes	%	±%
Labour Co-op	Bob Carden	1,141	22.75	−6.62
Conservative	Trevor Alford	1,082	21.57	+8.21
Conservative	Theo Brake-Child	1,039	20.71	+9.44
Labour Co-op	Nicole Murphy	980	19.54	−7.63
Liberal Democrats	Neville Reginald Searle	244	4.86	−1.46
Green	Anthony Ackroyd	179	3.57	−1.18
Liberal Democrats	Coreen Sears	176	3.51	−1.91
Green	Janette Ackroyd	175	3.49	+1.14
Turnout		2,692	35.85	−12.27
Labour Co-op hold		Swing		
Conservative gain from Labour Co-op		Swing		

=== Patcham ===
Patcham (3)
Party	Candidate	Votes	%	±%
Conservative	Brian Pidgeon	2,792	20.77	+1.11
Conservative	Carol Theobald	2,743	20.41	+1.48
Conservative	Geoffrey Theobald	2,702	20.10	+1.38
Labour Co-op	Peggy Betts	942	7.01	−1.95
Labour Co-op	Christine Moody	821	6.11	−0.72
Labour Co-op	Rosemary Collins	803	5.98	−0.68
Green	Geraldine Keenan	656	4.88	+2.41
Green	Mike Sells	451	3.36	+0.61
Liberal Democrats	Peter Edward Hughes Bailey	432	3.21	−1.43
Green	Julia Wilde	427	3.18	+0.87
Liberal Democrats	Bill Taylor	364	2.71	N/A
Liberal Democrats	Thomas Stokes	308	2.29	−1.37
Turnout		4,742	43.94	−9.28
Conservative hold		Swing		
Conservative hold		Swing		
Conservative hold		Swing		

=== Preston Park ===
Preston Park (3)
Party	Candidate	Votes	%	±%
Green	Amy Kennedy	1,633	12.37	−1.06
Labour Co-op	Juliet McCaffery	1,630	12.35	+1.17
Labour Co-op	Kevin Allen	1,474	11.16	+0.48
Labour Co-op	Nick Jarvis	1,324	10.03	+0.06
Green	Simon Williams	1,185	8.98	−1.09
Independent	Tracey-Ann Ross	1,057	8.01	N/A
Green	Andrew Knott	1,027	7.78	−1.46
Conservative	Clive Brimmell	755	5.72	−0.61
Conservative	Dan Kaufer	746	5.65	−0.24
Conservative	Jon Perrin	724	5.48	−0.21
Independent	Jo Offer	644	4.88	N/A
Liberal Democrats	Paul Durden	438	3.32	−2.77
Liberal Democrats	Lawrence Eke	298	2.26	−3.74
Liberal Democrats	Billy Tipping	267	2.02	−3.41
Turnout		4,767	44.91	−5.00
Green hold		Swing		
Labour Co-op hold		Swing		
Labour Co-op hold		Swing		

=== Queen's Park ===
Queens Park (3)
Party	Candidate	Votes	%	±%
Green	Rachel Fryer	1,826	14.26	+5.21
Green	Paul Steedman	1,549	12.10	+5.04
Green	Ben Duncan	1,473	11.50	+5.11
Labour Co-op	Delia Forester	1,458	11.39	−1.34
Labour Co-op	Kenneth Bodfish	1,455	11.36	−2.15
Labour Co-op	Simon Burgess	1,418	11.07	−1.92
Conservative	Nick Maskell	926	7.23	−0.24
Conservative	Ariane Poulain	820	6.40	−0.87
Conservative	Gail Woodcock	752	5.87	−1.32
Liberal Democrats	Elizabeth Robinson	369	2.88	−3.23
Liberal Democrats	Joe Blease	364	2.84	N/A
Liberal Democrats	Graham Arthur Bucknall	304	2.37	−2.38
Independent	John Walshe	91	0.71	N/A
Turnout		12,805	39.99	−1.49
Green gain from Labour Co-op		Swing	+3.1	
Green gain from Labour Co-op		Swing	+3.2	
Green gain from Labour Co-op		Swing	+3.8	

=== Regency ===
Regency (2)
Party	Candidate	Votes	%	±%
Green	Sven Rufus	863	17.19	+3.17
Green	Hermione Roy	781	16.10	+7.78
Labour Co-op	Roy Pennington	565	11.65	−3.17
Conservative	Michael Macfarlane	525	10.82	+1.47
Conservative	Robert Nemeth	516	10.64	+1.88
Liberal Democrats	Sue Bucknall	454	9.36	−6.15
Labour Co-op	Daniel Yates	447	9.21	−5.29
Liberal Democrats	Kevin Donnelly	425	8.76	−5.96
Brighton and Hove Independents	Corinne Attwood	218	4.49	N/A
Brighton and Hove Independents	Tony Davenport	57	1.18	N/A
Turnout		2,569	33.75	−1.35
Green gain from Liberal Democrats		Swing		
Green gain from Labour Co-op		Swing		

=== Rottingdean Coastal ===
Rottingdean Coastal (3)
Party	Candidate	Votes	%	±%
Conservative	Lynda Hyde	2,803	20.68	+0.07
Conservative	David Smith	2,679	19.77	+1.43
Conservative	Mary Mears	2,665	19.66	+1.51
Green	Geoffrey Bowden	932	6.88	+2.16
Green	Anita Gilson	827	6.10	+2.66
Green	Janet Hale	777	5.73	+2.74
Labour Co-op	Neil Mercer	580	4.28	−1.64
Liberal Democrats	Dawn Davidson	558	4.12	−0.95
Liberal Democrats	Birgit Hunter	490	3.62	−1.45
Labour Co-op	Mohammed Asaduzzaman	454	3.35	−1.94
Labour Co-op	Ian Tinlin	452	3.34	−1.35
Liberal Democrats	Shervin Sharghy	336	2.48	−1.24
Turnout		4,422	41.75	−12.01
Conservative hold		Swing		
Conservative hold		Swing		
Conservative hold		Swing		

=== South Portslade ===
South Portslande (2)
Party	Candidate	Votes	%	±%
Labour Co-op	Leslie Hamilton	1,119	21.34	−1.89
Conservative	Steve Harmer-Strange	1,061	20.23	+5.83
Conservative	Peter Lockyer	1,041	19.85	+7.47
Labour Co-op	Sue John	998	19.03	+0.32
Green	Kate Chapman	315	6.01	+2.32
Liberal Democrats	Ken Rist	279	5.32	+0.09
Liberal Democrats	Peter Denyer	242	4.61	−0.34
Green	Steve Watson	189	3.60	+0.05
Turnout		2,781	40.70	−5.91
Labour Co-op hold		Swing		
Conservative gain from Labour Co-op		Swing		

=== St Peter's and North Laine ===
St Peter's and North Laine (3)
Party	Candidate	Votes	%	±%
Green	Keith Taylor	2,303	19.20	+1.93
Green	Pete West	2,112	17.60	+0.92
Green	Ian Davey	2,099	17.50	+0.91
Labour Co-op	Sarah Ogden	979	8.16	−0.67
Labour Co-op	Greg Hadfield	921	7.68	−0.44
Labour Co-op	George Moody	883	7.36	−0.69
Conservative	Mike Long	505	4.21	+0.72
Conservative	Hans Miles	499	4.16	+0.67
Conservative	Jo Woodward	444	3.70	+0.23
Liberal Democrats	Martin Lindsay-Hills	371	3.10	−1.59
Liberal Democrats	Graham Hunnable	310	2.58	−1.93
Independent	Debbie Dawes	286	2.38	N/A
Liberal Democrats	William Parker	285	2.38	−1.43
Turnout		4,204	34.12	−6.47
Green hold		Swing		
Green hold		Swing		
Green hold		Swing		

=== Westbourne ===
Westbourne (2)
Party	Candidate	Votes	%	±%
Conservative	Brian Oxley	1,488	26.67	+3.61
Conservative	Denise Cobb	1,458	26.13	+3.86
Labour Co-op	Debbie Lunn	670	12.01	−2.06
Labour Co-op	Alan Robins	544	9.75	−2.90
Green	Louisa Greenbaum	450	8.06	+2.49
Green	Ollie Sykes	450	8.06	+4.56
Liberal Democrats	Clive Jarvis	268	4.80	−5.48
Liberal Democrats	Howard Spencer	253	2.53	−6.07
Turnout		2,881	38.86	−8.07
Conservative hold		Swing		
Conservative hold		Swing		

=== Wish ===
Wish (2)
Party	Candidate	Votes	%	±%
Conservative	Garry Peltzer Dunn	1,596	25.70	+2.74
Conservative	Ted Kemble	1,523	24.52	+2.89
Labour Co-op	Mark Wright	814	13.11	−6.33
Labour Co-op	Malcolm Prescott	801	12.90	−4.75
Green	Liz Wakefield	458	7.37	+4.31
Green	Sally Glaskin	271	4.36	−0.24
Liberal Democrats	Mark Lawrence Collins	269	4.33	−2.12
Liberal Democrats	Dinah Staples	350	4.03	−0.18
Protest Vote	Mark Stack	229	3.69	N/A
Turnout		3,237	46.58	−8.47
Conservative hold		Swing		
Conservative hold		Swing		

=== Withdean ===
Withdean (3)
Party	Candidate	Votes	%	±%
Conservative	Pat Drake	2,094	15.57	−1.50
Conservative	Ann Norman	2,066	15.36	−1.45
Conservative	Ken Norman	2,004	14.90	−1.72
Brighton and Hove Independents	Michael Whitty	756	5.62	N/A
Labour Co-op	Mike Middleton	751	5.58	−0.52
Labour Co-op	Gary Thurston	729	5.42	−1.50
Green	Eddie Wearing	719	5.35	+0.81
Labour Co-op	Jack Kiffin	692	5.14	−1.40
Brighton and Hove Independents	James Simister	679	5.05	N/A
Green	Lynn Mackenzie	668	4.97	+0.83
Brighton and Hove Independents	Simon Swan	605	4.50	N/A
Green	Omar Jebari	509	3.78	+0.90
Liberal Democrats	John Lovatt	434	3.23	−2.87
Liberal Democrats	Robert Stockman	384	2.86	−2.81
Liberal Democrats	Hyder Khalil	360	2.68	−2.78
Turnout		4,714	43.68	−10.06
Conservative hold		Swing		
Conservative hold		Swing		
Conservative hold		Swing		

=== Woodingdean ===
Woodingdean (2)
Party	Candidate	Votes	%	±%
Conservative	Dee Simson	1,843	33.15	+1.46
Conservative	Geoff Wells	1,840	33.09	+0.83
Labour Co-op	Karen Barford	549	9.87	−2.47
Labour Co-op	Mark Maguire	502	9.03	−2.39
Liberal Democrats	Joy DeSouza	237	4.26	+0.53
Green	Alan Pegg	221	3.97	+1.16
Green	Nellie Jones	192	3.45	+1.48
Liberal Democrats	Rosemary Lovatt	176	3.17	−0.60
Turnout		2,902	38.84	−16.49
Conservative hold		Swing		
Conservative hold		Swing		
