= United Kingdom industrial disputes and strikes (2022–present) =

Labour disputes in the UK

Since May–June 2022, a series of labour strikes and industrial disputes have occurred in various industries of the United Kingdom's economy as workers walked out over pay and conditions. The strikes took place with rising inflation, and demands for pay increases that would keep pace with this inflation.

The strikes began on 15 June 2022 after members of the National Union of Rail, Maritime and Transport Workers (RMT) voted to strike over planned changes to their pay and working conditions. They were soon joined by other railway unions, and a series of one-day strikes halted trains in many parts of the British mainland. Train services operated at 20% of normal capacity on strike days. Public support for the strikes was organised through the Enough is Enough! campaign.

With industrial action on the railways ongoing, trade union members working in other industries voted to take industrial action, including telecommunications, the postal service, legal profession and freight, as well as other areas of the transport sector.

== Transport ==
=== Rail transport ===
==== National Union of Rail, Maritime and Transport Workers ====
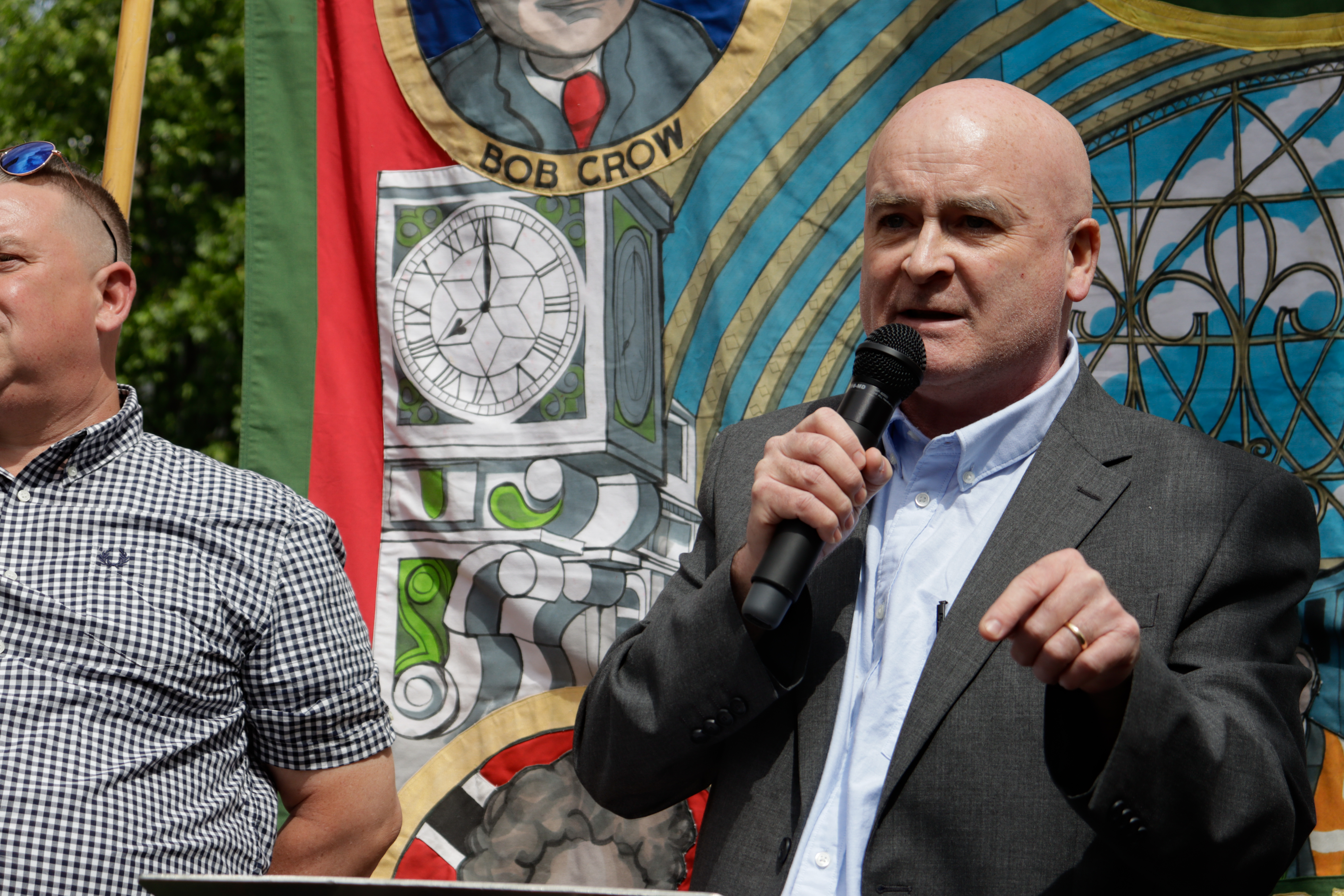
Mick Lynch at RMT solidarity strike rally at London Kings Cross, 25 June 2022

Following a ballot of National Union of Rail, Maritime and Transport Workers members over whether to take industrial action, it was announced on 24 May 2022 that they had voted in favour of strike action, paving the way for the UK's first national rail strike for three decades. Workers at Abellio Greater Anglia, Avanti West Coast, c2c, Chiltern Railways, CrossCountry, East Midlands Railway, Great Western, London North Eastern Railway, Northern Trains, Southeastern, South Western Railway, TransPennine Express and West Midlands Trains voted to strike, with 71% of those balloted taking part in the vote; of those 89% voting in favour of strike action and 11% against. The ballot at Thameslink, Southern and Great Northern did not support strike action but supported industrial action short of a strike. Mick Lynch, General Secretary of the RMT said the decision "sends a clear message that members want a decent pay rise, job security and no compulsory redundancies". The action would see the largest outbreak of industrial action in the United Kingdom since 1989, and the first national strike involving the UK's railways since 1994, when signal workers walked out over a pay dispute with Railtrack.

On 7 June, initial strike dates were announced for 21, 23 and 25 June, with rail employees at Network Rail and 13 train operators joining the action. It was also announced that the 21 June strike would coincide with a planned 24-hour strike to be held by workers on the London Underground. The 21 June walkout involved 40,000 rail staff, as well as 10,000 workers from London Underground. Further strikes were subsequently called for 27 July, 18 and 20 August. and 15 and 17 September. Following the death of Queen Elizabeth II on 8 September, the strikes scheduled for 15 and 17 September were suspended. On 20 September a strike was announced for 1 October.

On 22 September, an RMT strike was announced for 8 October, which the union described as "effectively shutting down the railway network". As the 8 October strike approached, and with no further national strikes scheduled for after then, Mick Lynch announced that members would be balloted to determine if they wished to continue with the strikes. On 19 October, a further three strike days were announced for November, occurring on 3, 5, and 7 November. On 4 November the RMT announced the strikes had been suspended and that they would enter into "a period of intensive negotiations" with Network Rail and the train operators. Network Rail announced that because of the strikes had been called off at the eleventh hour there would remain "severe disruption" to services the following day, as well as on 7 November.

In Scotland, a separate strike was called for 10 October after the RMT rejected a 5% pay offer from ScotRail that was described as a "kick in the teeth". An RMT strike involving staff at Avanti West Coast was held on 22 October, forcing the cancellation of a number of services throughout the day.

On 22 November, the RMT announced four 48-hour strikes in the run up to Christmas and early 2023, with strike action scheduled for 13–14 December, 16–17 December, 3–4 January and 6–7 January. On 5 December, RMT staff working for Network Rail (roughly half of those involved in the dispute) announced a strike over Christmas, beginning at 6pm on Christmas Eve and continuing until 6am on 27 December.

On 10 February 2023, the RMT's executive committee rejected a pay deal described by the Rail Delivery Group and Network Rail as their "best and final" offer, and said they would seek further negotiations. Industry and the UK government had wanted the deal to be put to the RMT's members in a ballot. On 16 February the RMT announced four new days of strikes during March and April, with the dates confirmed as 16, 18 and 30 March, and 1 April. On 7 March, RMT staff working for Network Rail called off a strike planned for 16 March after being given a fresh pay offer. On 22 March the strikes scheduled for 30 March and 1 April were called off following discussions with RMT representatives of train company staff and the Rail Delivery Group.

On 27 April 2023, and after the RMT rejected the latest pay offer from the Rail Delivery Group, a fresh strike was called for Saturday 13 May. On 4 May 2023, members of the RMT voted to renew the union's mandate to take strike action for a further six months. On 18 May, a further RMT strike was announced for 2 June. On 22 June, three further days of strike action were announced for 20, 22 and 29 July. On 11 August two days of weekend strike action were announced for Saturday 26 August and Saturday 2 September.

On 19 October 2023, members of the RMT voted to stage a further six months of strike action. On 8 November, it was confirmed that members of the RMT would vote on a revised pay offer and guarantee of job security that would end the strike action if accepted. On 30 November, RMT members voted to accept the pay deal from 14 train companies, ending their strike action.

==== Associated Society of Locomotive Engineers and Firemen ====
On 9 June, members of the Associated Society of Locomotive Engineers & Firemen (ASLEF) voted to strike in a separate dispute. The union, which represents train drivers, announced plans to hold strike action on 23 and 26 June and 13 and 14 July. The train operators affected were Abellio Greater Anglia, Hull Trains and Tramlink. ASLEF members staged a strike on 2 July, affecting 90% of train services operated by Abellio Greater Anglia.

On 11 July, members of the Associated Society of Locomotive Engineers and Firemen (ASLEF) at eight train operators voted to take strike action in a dispute over pay, while members of the Transport Salaried Staffs' Association (TSSA) at South Western Railway also voted to take industrial action. On 14 July, ASLEF announced that train drivers at eight train companies – Arriva Rail London, Chiltern Railways, Great Western Railway, LNER, Greater Anglia, Southeastern, Hull Trains and West Midlands Trains – would strike on 30 July, involving around 5,500 union members. A second day of ASLEF strike action was subsequently staged on 13 August.

On 25 August, train drivers at Chiltern Railways, Northern Trains and TransPennine Express belonging to the ASLEF union voted to take strike action in a dispute over pay and conditions.

On 31 August, ASLEF announced that train drivers from 12 train companies would strike on 15 September, but the strike was suspended following the death of Queen Elizabeth II on 8 September. On 20 September a further two strikes were announced for 1 and 5 October.

On 10 November, the ASLEF union announced that around 9,500 train divers at 12 train operators would strike on 26 November. On 20 December, ASLEF announced a 24-hour strike involving drivers at 15 train companies for 5 January 2023, falling in between two strikes announced by the RMT for January. On 17 January ASLEF announced a further two strikes, to be held on 1 and 3 February.

On 27 April 2023, and after a pay offer from the Rail Delivery Group was rejected, fresh strikes were announced for 12 May, 31 May and 3 June. Following this, a six-day overtime ban was announced, involving train drivers at 16 train operators and beginning from Monday 3 July, threatening disruption to services. On 18 August, a strike was announced for Friday 1 September, followed by an overtime ban on Saturday 2 September. On 15 September, a further two strike days were announced for 30 September and 4 October. On 16 November, ASLEF announced new strike dates, with a rolling programme of strikes from 2 December to 8 December affecting different train companies on different days.

On 15 January 2024, another week of strike action was announced by the ASLEF train drivers union, to run from Tuesday 30 January until Monday 5 February, with drivers from different companies striking on different days throughout the week. On 14 February, ASLEF announced that drivers at five train operators – Chiltern, c2c, East Midlands, Northern and TransPennine – had voted for a further six months of industrial action.

On 14 August 2024, and following further negotiations with the Department for Transport, ASLEF announced it would ballot its members on a revised pay offer. On 18 September, ASLEF announced that its members had accepted a pay deal of 15% from the UK government, ending two years of strike action in England, Wales and Scotland.

===== Avanti West Coast dispute =====
On 16 June, drivers at Avanti West Coast announced a one-day strike on 2 July over the terms of sick pay. This strike was subsequently called off on 22 June after Avanti agreed to remove the policy regarding sick pay. A second six-day overtime ban commenced from Monday 17 July, with a third announced on that date to begin on Monday 31 July.

===== London North Eastern Railway =====
On 22 January 2024, a planned five-day strike by train drivers belonging to ASLEF at LNER beginning on 5 February was called off.

On 16 August 2024, ASLEF announced that its members at LNER would stage strikes every weekend through September and October, as well as two in November, following what it describes as a break down in industrial relations and agreements. On 29 August, it was announced the strikes had been called off following last-minute talks between union and company officials.

===== ScotRail =====
Following a longstanding dispute between ASLEF and ScotRail, during which strike action was threatened, on 26 August 2024, the union announced it had suspended forthcoming strike action for ScotRail drivers following a new pay offer. ASLEF said it would ballot its members on the offer. On 25 September, ScotRail train drivers belonging to ASLEF voted to accept a 4.5% pay rise backdated to April, ending their dispute.

==== Transport Salaried Staffs' Association ====
On 30 June, the Transport Salaried Staffs' Association (TSSA) confirmed its members at Avanti West Coast had voted overwhelmingly for strikes and action short of a strike, ostensibly over the same issues that had triggered the RMT dispute, with 86% voting for strike action and 91% voting for action short of a strike on a 91% turnout. The union said it also planned to ballot staff at Network Rail and other train companies who operate at stations along the West Coast Main Line. On 11 July, TSSA members at South Western Railway also voted to take industrial action.

The TSSA joined the RMT on the 18 and 20 August strikes.

On 31 August, another TSSA strike affecting TransPennine Express, West Midlands Trains, Avanti West Coast, c2c, CrossCountry, East Midlands Railway, Great Western Railway, LNER and Southeastern, as well as Network Rail, was announced for 26 September, when it would commence at midday.

===== Merseyrail =====
On 22 June, it was reported that members of the Transport Salaried Staffs' Association (TSSA) had voted to accept a 7.1% pay rise following an ongoing dispute with Merseyrail which had led to strike action. Unlike the train operators involved in the national dispute, Merseyrail is a fully devolved Train Operating Company and therefore not required to consult the government on issues such as levels of pay and industrial disputes. Manuel Cortes, General Secretary of the TSSA, described the deal as "a sensible outcome to a reasonable offer".

==== London Underground ====
On 24 June, members of the RMT working on the London Underground voted to continue with strike action for a further six months in an ongoing dispute over pensions and job cuts. The continued industrial action was supported by 90% of voting members on a 53% turnout. On 3 August RMT workers on the London Underground network, and London Overground trains served by Arriva Rail London, announced a 24-hour strike for 19 August; workers at Arriva Rail London had rejected a 5% pay offer. On 6 July 2023, RMT workers on the London Underground announced six days of strikes from Sunday 23 July to Friday 28 July.

Strikes were planned on the London Underground between 23 and 28 July 2023, with the RMT set to walk out for six days, while members of Unite and ASLEF would strike on 26 and 28 July. On 21 July, it was announced the strikes had been called off following last minute talks between union representatives and Transport for London. Strikes involving around 3,000 RMT staff were planned for 4 and 6 October, but were cancelled on 3 October following "significant progress" in talks over pay and conditions.

On 5 January 2024, and following the breakdown of last minute talks with Transport for London, London Underground staff belonging to the RMT began a week of strikes from that evening, which were scheduled to end on 12 January. The strikes would include the winding down of tube services from Sunday 7 January, an event which was expected to cause major travel disruption to commuters in London. On 7 January, the RMT announced the strike had been called off.

==== Channel Tunnel ====
On 21 December 2023, Eurostar were forced to cancel a number of services following a last-minute strike by staff at the Channel Tunnel operator, Getlink. Eurostar urged its customers not to travel as a result of the strike.

=== Air transport ===
==== Heathrow Airport ====
On 23 June 2022, it was announced that 700 staff at Heathrow Airport who belong to the GMB and Unite unions had voted to hold strike action during the summer holidays, when the number of overseas travellers was expected to be at pre-pandemic levels. On 7 July, the strike action was suspended, following further discussions between union representatives and British Airways, which had resulted in what the union described as a "vastly improved" pay offer.

On 7 June 2023, the Unite union announced that around 2,000 security officers at Heathrow Airport would stage 31 days of strikes between 24 June and 27 August. But, on 12 June, it was announced that the first two days of that strike action had been called off after they received an improved pay offer. On 23 June, the strikes were called off after staff voted to accept a pay increase worth between 15.5% and 17.5%.

On 23 April 2024, the Unite union announced that 800 of its staff at Heathrow Airport would stage a strike from 7 to 13 May over outsourcing of jobs.

==== UK Border Force ====
On 7 December 2022, it was announced that UK Border Force staff at several UK airports and who belong to the Public and Commercial Services Union (PCS) would hold eight days of strike action over Christmas.

===== UK Border Force at Heathrow Airport =====
On 22 March, the Public and Commercial Services Union announced that its members working as UK Border Force employees at Heathrow Airport had voted to strike over shift patterns. A four-day strike was subsequently called for 11 April, but on 5 April, PCS General Secretary Fran Heathcote announced it had been suspended to allow fresh talks with the Home Office to take place. On 16 August, the PCS union announced a four-day strike had been called from 31 August to 3 September, with a work-to-rule to follow until 22 September. The strike went ahead as scheduled.

==== Loganair ====
On 3 March 2023, Loganair announced it would suspend flights between Inverness Airport and some island airports for at least six weeks from 17 March because of industrial action scheduled to begin at Highland and Islands Airports Limited.

==== Gatwick Airport ====
On 14 July 2023, Unite announced that around 1,000 workers at Gatwick Airport would stage eight days of strike action through July and August in a dispute over pay.

==== Virgin Atlantic ====
On 6 August 2023, the British Airline Pilots' Association (BALPA) announced that in a recent vote, 96% of Virgin Atlantic pilots had supported a ballot on industrial action following concerns "serious concerns" about fatigue and their wellbeing.

=== Buses ===
==== Stagecoach Merseyside & South Lancashire ====
On 1 July, it was confirmed that roughly 370 Unite members employed as bus drivers at Stagecoach Merseyside and South Lancashire would begin eight days of strike action from 4 July in a dispute over wages. Around 1,600 Unite members working for London United Busways staged a 48-hour strike on 19 and 20 August, affecting bus routes in West and South West London, as well as parts of Surrey, and over 2,000 Unite members working for Arriva London are set to stage continuous strike action from 4 October, affecting bus routes in North, East and South London.

==== Abellio London ====
On 13 February 2023, a long-running dispute between the Unite union and Abellio London, involving around 1,600 bus drivers in London was resolved when they accepted a deal that would mean drivers with two years' service being paid £18 an hour.

==== National Express West Midlands ====
On 2 March, members of the Unite union working for National Express West Midlands voted to strike, with strike action set to begin on 16 March. The industrial action would involve 3,000 bus drivers and affect 1,600 bus routes across the Birmingham, Coventry, Wolverhampton and other parts of the West Midlands. On 13 March, the strike scheduled for 16 March was called off after they received a revised pay offer, which Unite said it would put to its members. However, on 16 March, a fresh strike was called for Monday 20 March after Unite claimed National Express would not allow the drivers to vote on the pay offer. The indefinite strike commenced on 20 March, affecting 93% of bus services in Birmingham. National Express operated a limited service to serve major hospitals in the area, and warned people not to travel by bus unless absolutely necessary. On 23 March, it was reported that National Express had offered a revised pay rise worth 16.2%. The company also released a statement confirming Unite would recommend the increase to its members. The Birmingham Mail reported that the strikes would continue over 24 and 25 March while Unite members were balloted on the new offer. On 25 March, Unite members voted to accept the new pay offer ending the strike. National Express West Midlands said it would run a reduced service the next day, a Sunday, then would run services "as close to normal as possible" on Monday 27 March.

==== Stagecoach Warwickshire ====
On 17 August 2023, it was reported that around 300 Stagecoach drivers in Warwickshire, a county where the company operates 87% of the bus routes, were set to begin open ended strike action after rejecting a pay offer worth 7.8% in the first year and 4.5% in the second, claiming it would be a pay cut in real terms. Discussions between union representatives and Stagecoach were ongoing. On 1 September, Unite announced the bus drivers based at Stagecoach depots at Leamington, Rugby and Nuneaton would begin an indefinite strike from 5 September after rejecting a revised 14.3% pay offer. The strike would coincide with the first week of a new school term. On 4 September, and following last-minute talks between union representatives and Stagecoach, the planned strike action was suspended for a week to give Unite members time to consider a new pay offer. The planned strike action was subsequently called off after union members voted to accept a new pay offer worth 12.4% over two years.

==== Go North East ====
On 30 September 2023, Go North East bus drivers began strike action after last-minute talks over pay between the bus operator and Unite ended without a resolution.

=== Freight ===
On 5 August, the Unite union announced that 1,900 workers at Felixstowe Docks, one of the UK's largest ports, would stage an eight-day strike from 21 August, after rejecting a 7% pay rise from the Felixstowe Dock and Railway Company. Unite described the pay offer as "significantly below" the rate of inflation. The strike represented the first such industrial action for three decades.

Over 70 lorry drivers and shunters represented by Unite and employed at a depot of the dairy company Müller in Stonehouse, Gloucestershire took strike action between 25 and 27 August and 1–3 September after the company imposed changes to employees' rosters that would result in working at least one day every weekend, after the company had signed an agreement with Unite six months previously committing to no roster changes. The drivers undertook a further 11 day strike from 25 October, and Unite has said that more strikes will be scheduled if the roster changes are not rescinded.

=== Trains and buses ===
==== Translink ====
On 22 November 2023, the GMB, Unite and SIPTU trade unions, who represent workers at Northern Ireland's Translink bus and rail services, called a one day strike for 1 December. On 6 December, three more strike days involving Translink bus and train staff were announced for 15, 16 and 22 December. A one-day transport strike was held in Northern Ireland on 1 February 2024, affecting bus and train services. On 22 February, Unite, GMB and Siptu called a three-day strike for 27, 28 and 29 February. On 25 February, the unions confirmed the strike had been suspended following the receipt of a renewed pay offer, which would be put to their members in a ballot. On 12 March, Unite, GMB and Siptu announced that their members had "decisively voted to reject" the pay offer from Translink, which was worth 5%, together with a one-off payment of £1,500 for the 2023–24 financial year. On 15 March, the trade unions agreed to re-enter talks with Translink over their pay dispute.

=== Trams ===
==== Edinburgh tram network ====
On 14 August, Unite announced that staff working on Edinburgh's tram network had voted to take strike action over a lack of toilet breaks for staff on late running services, something they argued had led to health problems. The 160 staff included drivers, ticket collectors and controllers, with 90% of those taking part in the ballot choosing to strike.

== Barristers ==
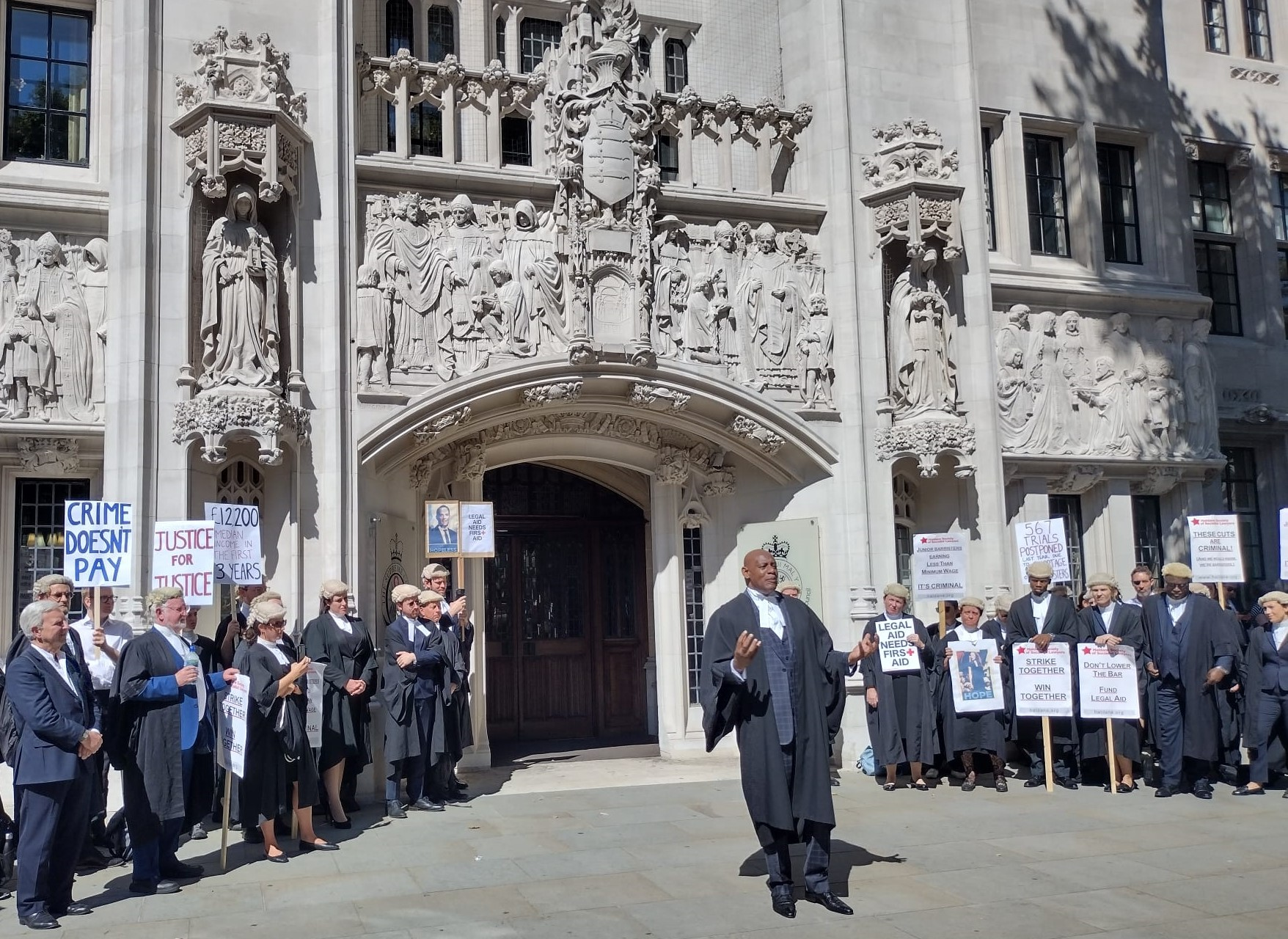
Barrister and TV personality Shaun Wallace addresses a rally supporting the barristers' industrial action outside the Supreme Court, London, 11 July 2022

On 27 June, members of the Criminal Bar Association in England and Wales began four weeks of industrial action after rejecting a 15% pay raise. The government planned the raise to begin October 2022; the CBA said the proposal only amounted to 9 percent pay increase and was insufficient to retain barristers. The walkout disrupted 90% of proceedings at the Old Bailey as barristers demanded a 25% increase. This came after two decades of cuts to and freezes of legal aid rates in addition to a 28% decrease in real wages of barristers, whose average salary for the first three years was £12,200.

On 22 August, it was announced that barristers had voted to strike indefinitely from 5 September, with 79.9% of those voting on the issue in favour of the plans. On 10 October, the Criminal Bar Association announced that barristers in England and Wales had voted to end their industrial action, after accepting a pay deal worth 15% from the government, with 57% of those entitled to vote doing so.

On 29 October 2023, the Bar of Northern Ireland announced a one-day barristers' strike on 17 November over what it described as "wholly unreasonable delays" in barristers receiving legal aid payments. The industrial action will include around 200 barristers.

== Postal service ==
On 27 June, it was announced that members of the Communication Workers Union (CWU) at 114 Crown Post Offices, the largest branches typically on a high street or city centre, would walk out on 11 July in an ongoing dispute over pay. It would be the third time the union had staged industrial action during 2022, after members rejected a 3% pay rise and a £500 lump sum.

On 29 June, Royal Mail managers belonging to the Unite union voted to take industrial action in a dispute over redundancies and a redeployment programme to bring in what they described as "worsening terms and conditions"; the vote for strike action was 86% in the UK mainland and 89% in Northern Ireland. On 19 July, Royal Mail workers belonging to the Communication Workers Union voted to take strike action; the stoppage would involve roughly 115,000 staff members. The first of four one day Royal Mail strikes was held on 26 August, with further industrial action planned for 31 August, and 8 and 9 September. The 9 September strike was suspended following the death of Queen Elizabeth II the previous day.

On 28 September, the Communication Workers Union announced a further 19 days of strikes through October and November 2022, with industrial action targeted to affect peak periods of postal service usage, including Black Friday and Cyber Monday. On 30 October, the CWU announced they had called off strikes for the next two weeks following a legal letter sent to them by Royal Mail, but said the strike action would continue on 12 November. On 31 October, the CWU announced plans to meet the following day to discuss further strike action after rejecting a 7% pay deal over two years that was subject to postal workers agreeing to changes such as Sunday working and start times. The CWU accused Royal Mail of "imposing change not negotiating".

On 15 April 2023, it was reported that the Communication Workers Union had reached an agreement in principle with Royal Mail to end the strikes. On 21 April, CWU leaders recommended members accept the pay offer, worth 10% over the next three years.

On 11 July 2023, the CWU announced that its 115,000 members had voted overwhelmingly to accept a three-year deal from Royal Mail, ending their dispute.

== Healthcare ==
In summer 2022 the government announced below inflation pay rises which lead to a series of strike ballots by health unions.

In November 2022, James Smith of the London School of Hygiene & Tropical Medicine, Ryan Essex of the University of Greenwich and Rita Issa of University College London wrote in The Lancet that there was no clear evidence of rising patient morbidity or mortality during periods of strike action. Minimum service level agreements for healthcare typically ensured the most urgent services continued. One of many results of health underfunding was lower pay, which lead to staff leaving and further weakened the health system. It was argued short-term disruption was undertaken to achieve greater long-term collective benefit. It was further argued that health professionals have a duty to draw attention to, protest against, and resist actions that harm collective health. The authors called for solidarity between different health care unions.

=== Doctors ===
==== Doctors in England ====
===== Junior doctors =====
On 28 June, GPs at the Annual General Meeting of the British Medical Association voted to take industrial action over new contracts requiring them to work on weekday evenings and Saturdays.

On 30 August, and following an emergency meeting of its members, the British Medical Association announced plans to ballot junior doctors on industrial action.

On 20 February 2023, junior doctors in England voted to strike in their ongoing dispute for a 26% pay rise, and announced they would stage a 72-hour walkout. The British Medical Association maintained junior doctors' pay was cut by 26% since 2008 after inflation was considered. On 24 February, the British Medical Association announced that junior doctors in England would begin a three-day strike on 13 March. On 4 March it was reported that senior consultants covering for junior doctors during the strike were demanding £158 pre hour, rising to £282 per hour at night, three times their usual pay.

On 23 March, the British Medical Association announced that junior doctors in England would stage a four-day strike from 11 to 15 April in their continued quest for a 35% pay rise. The strike began as scheduled on 11 April. Figures subsequently released by NHS England indicated that 196,000 hospital appointments were cancelled as a result of the strike.

On 22 May 2023, and after the latest round of talks with the government ended without resolution, the BMA announced that junior doctors would stage another 72-hour strike, scheduled to begin on 14 June.

On 23 June 2023, junior doctors in England announced that they would be taking part in further strike action over pay between 13 July and 18 July, their longest strike so far. As that strike began, the UK government announced a pay increase for NHS doctors of 6%, together with a £1,250 uplift payment. The increase was below the 35% being sought by doctors, but Prime Minister Rishi Sunak urged them to "do the right thing" by calling off the strikes. Junior doctors in England began another four day strike on 11 August, their fifth walkout.

On 27 June 2023, the BMA announced that senior consultants in England would begin strike action after 86% of those who took part in a ballot voted to take strike action; a previously announced 48-hour strike would go ahead from 21 July. On 17 July, a further two strike days were announced for 24 and 25 August. On 8 August, a further two days of strike action was announced for 19 and 20 September. On 31 August, and after junior doctors in England voted to continue strike action (with 98% of ballot responders voting in favour), the British Medical Association announced that junior doctors and consultants would stage co-ordinated strikes going forward.

On 29 August 2023, figures released by NHS England indicated that almost one million appointments had been lost since the beginning of the industrial action. On 14 September Prime Minister Rishi Sunak blamed striking doctors for the government's failure to reduce hospital waiting lists in England, saying it would be difficult to meet the government's promised target of reducing waiting lists by March 2024. Doctors in England began a 72-hour strike as their dispute over pay and conditions continued.

On 20 October 2023, the BMA announced that specialist doctors in England had voted overwhelmingly to take strike action of pay, but said they would enter into talks with the UK government. It was also announced that junior doctors in England would hold talks with the government.

On 5 December 2023, the BMA announced that junior doctors in England would stage further strike action after rejecting the latest pay offer, with a three day strike scheduled to begin on 20 December and a six day strike scheduled to begin on 3 January 2024. The three-day strike commenced at 7am on 20 December. Thousands of junior doctors began the six-day walkout, the longest strike in NHS history, on 3 January 2024. On 9 February, another strike was announced for 24 February, which was scheduled to last until 28 February. The strike, which commenced at 7.00am on 24 February, was the tenth to be staged by junior doctors during their dispute. On 20 March, junior doctors in England voted in favour of continuing their industrial action for a further six months, with 98% of the 62% of respondents voting to continue the dispute. On 29 May, the BMA announces that junior doctors in England would stage a five-day strike from 27 June, ahead of that year's general election. On 27 June,, junior doctors in England began the strike, their eleventh since their pay dispute began. On 9 July, and a few days after Labour won the 2024 general election, new Health Secretary Wes Streeting began talks with junior doctors in England aimed at ending their pay dispute. On 29 July, the UK government and the British Medical Association (BMA) reached agreement on an improved pay deal for junior doctors in England worth 22% on average over two years, which the BMA said it would put to its members. On 16 September, junior doctors in England accepted the government's offer of a 22% pay rise over two years, ending their long-running dispute.

===== Senior consultants =====
On 25 January 2024, the BMA announced that senior consultants in England had voted by 51% to reject the UK government's latest pay offer, worth an extra 4.5%. The offer was rejected on a 66% turnout. On 5 March, the British Medical Association and the Hospital Consultants and Specialists Association provisionally gave their backing to an improved pay offer for senior consultants in England and announced they would ballot members to see if they were willing to accept. On 5 April, it was announced that senior consultants belonging to the British Medical Association (BMA) and the Hospital Consultants and Specialists Association (HCSA) had voted to accept a pay offer from the UK government worth almost 20% for 2023–24, thus ending their dispute. On 18 June, it was announced that speciality and associate specialist (SAS) doctors in England had voted to accept a pay offer from the government, ending their pay dispute.

===== GPs =====
On 1 August 2024, it was announced that GPs in England had voted to take industrial action by working-to-rule over a lack of funding and a decline in care, which could see GP appointments capped at 25 per day.

==== Doctors in Northern Ireland ====
On 8 January 2024, the junior doctors' union, the Northern Ireland Junior Doctor Committee, announced a ballot of its members on industrial action over pay, which is significantly lower than that for junior doctors in England, Scotland and the Republic of Ireland. On 19 February 2024, the Committee announced that junior doctors in Northern Ireland had voted to take industrial action, with a 24-hour strike scheduled to take place on 6–7 March. The strike, the first to be staged by junior doctors in Northern Ireland, began at 7am on 6 March. On 2 May, two further 48-hour strikes were announced for 22–24 May and 6–8 June after talks between junior doctors and the Department of Health broke down. On 6 June, junior doctors in Northern Ireland began a 48-hour strike, commencing at 7am.

==== Doctors in Scotland ====
On 5 May 2023, junior doctors in Scotland voted to stage a three-day strike over their demand for a 23.5% above inflation pay increase from the Scottish Government. Of those who voted, 97% were in favour of the strike action. On 22 May, the Scottish Government offered them a 14.5% pay rise. BMA Scotland said it would put the offer to its members. After that offer was rejected by members of BMA Scotland, on 13 June 2023 the union announced that junior doctors in Scotland would stage a three-day strike from 12 to 15 July. On 7 July, the strike was called off while it consulted its members on a revised 12.4% pay offer for 2023–24. On 16 August, the BMA announced that junior doctors in Scotland had voted to accept a pay offer from the Scottish Government worth 4.5% for 2022–23 and 12.4% for 2023–24.

On 29 November 2024, GP leaders in Scotland voted in favour of a motion to ballot workers on industrial action over pay, following what they described as "years of disinvestment in general practice".

==== Doctors in Wales ====
On 4 August 2023, doctors belonging to BMA Cymru rejected a 5% pay offer from the Welsh Government, describing it as the "worst offer in the UK". On 18 December, and after 98% of the 65% who responded to a ballot voted to take industrial action, a three-day strike was announced for January 2024, beginning on 15 January. Ahead of the strike, which would take place in midwinter, NHS officials expressed their concern it would coincide with one of the most difficult weeks of the year for the NHS. On 21 February, junior doctors in Wales began another 72-hour strike. On 25 March, junior doctors in Wales began a four-day strike, their longest to date.

On 1 March 2024, consultants and specialist doctors in Wales voted to take strike action over pay. A two-day strike was subsequently announced to begin on 16 April. However, on 9 April the strike was suspended following "constructive talks" and a "significant" pay offer from the Welsh Government.

On 7 June 2024, doctors leaders recommended doctors in Wales accept the latest pay offer, which the Welsh Government said was in line with that offered to doctors in Scotland. Subject to the offer being accepted, junior doctors would receive an additional 7.4%, taking the total to 12.4% for 2023-24, while there would also be the potential for an additional 10.1% for some senior consultants. On 28 June, the British Medical Association confirmed that junior doctors, consultants and specialist doctors in Wales had voted to accept the revised pay offer, worth an extra 7.4%, giving them a total increase of 12.4% for the 2023–24 financial year, and ending their dispute with the Welsh Government.

=== Nurses ===
==== Nurses in England and Wales ====
On 6 October 2022, the Royal College of Nursing announced plans to ballot its 300,000 members on strike action, the first time it had done so in its 106-year history. The RCN also said it would recommend its members voted in favour of industrial action. In solidarity with the RCN ballot, Unison announced that they would concurrently ballot their NHS workers for industrial action, with the ballot opening on 27 October.

On 9 November, the Royal College of Nursing announced that it had achieved a mandate to strike in the majority of NHS trusts. On 17 November, the RCN warned the Secretary of State for Health and Social Care, Steve Barclay, that the Government had five days to open formal negotiations, or strikes would be announced for December 2022. The RCN later confirmed that strikes would commence on 15 and 20 December. Following further failed negotiations, the union's members went on strike again on the 18 and 19 January 2023, in more hospitals than the December 2022 strikes. On 16 January 2023, the Royal College of Nursing announced a further two strike days for England and Wales on 6 and 7 February, which are set to be the biggest so far.

On 16 February, the Royal College of Nursing announced a 48-hour strike to begin on 1 March, which it said would be the biggest in England so far, with half of hospital, mental health and community services affected. However, on 21 February, it was announced the strike had been called off to allow the Royal College of Nursing and Department of Health and Social Care to enter into renewed negotiations. But, on 14 April, and after rejecting a pay deal, the Royal College of Nursing announced that nurses in England would stage a 48-hour strike from 8pm on 30 April to 8pm on 2 May. During an appearance on the 16 April edition of BBC One's political programme Sunday with Laura Kuenssberg, Pat Cullen, the General Secretary of the Royal College of Nursing, suggested any new strike action could last until the end of the year, and urged the government to resume negotiations.

On 21 April, NHS Employers said it had received legal advice that the timing of the strike may be unlawful because it would fall outside the six-month period that began when RCN members voted to strike, and they had therefore written to Steve Barclay, the Secretary of State for Health, requesting that he seek advice on the matter. The RCN strike ballot closed on 2 November 2022, so there was concern any strike action on or after 2 May 2023 would mean the RCN would not be protected by trade union laws. When it emerged the following day that Barclay was considering whether to take the RCN to court, Cullen described the prospect as "cruel" and "unacceptable", and accused the government of wishing to punish the RCN for not accepting the pay offer. On 27 April, Mr Justice Linden ruled that the strike was partially unlawful, prompting the RCN to cut it short by a day, and meaning it would now end on 1 May. The RCN were also ordered to pay the case's legal costs. Barclay said it was "regrettable" the government had been required to go to court, but Cullen described the decision as "the darkest day" of the dispute so far. A shortened, 28-hour strike began at 8pm on 30 April, and was scheduled to end at midnight the following day. The RCN said that during the strike nurses could be called in to provide minimal support in trauma and intensive care settings. On 1 May, NHS England said that around half of hospital, mental health and community services were affected. On 27 June, it was announced that nurses in England would not continue their strike action after a Royal College of Nursing ballot failed to garner enough votes to achieve a mandate. The majority of the 43% who voted favoured continued strike action, but this was below the 50% turnout required under trade union regulations.

With the majority of health unions (apart from the RCN) having accepted the 5% pay offer by mid-May, the Department of Health was reported to have said the offer would be the final one made by the government. This prompted Cullen to urge the government to reopen negotiations and to make a double digit offer.

On 1 September 2023, members of the Royal College of Nursing in Wales voted to accept a 5% pay rise from the Welsh Government, along with a one-off payment of between £900 and £1,190, ending the nursing strikes in Wales.

On 23 September, the Royal College of Nursing announced that nurses in England had rejected the offer of a 5.5% pay increase from the UK government.

==== Nurses in Scotland ====
On 21 December, the Royal College of Nursing in Scotland rejected a 7.5% pay deal, and announced that strike dates would be confirmed in January 2023. On 23 December, Scottish Health Secretary Humza Yousaf confirmed he would resume talks with trade unions in a bid to avoid strike action taking place in the Scottish National Health Service. On 13 January 2023, the GMB and RCN unions announced strikes in Scotland would be put on hold while negotiations were held on a pay deal.

On 17 February 2023, the Royal College of Nursing recommended its members accept a new pay offer of 6.5%. The offer from the Scottish Government also included changes to conditions.

==== Nurses in Northern Ireland ====
On 6 January 2024, the Royal College of Nursing announced that nurses in Northern Ireland would stage a one-day strike on 18 January over pay.

=== Ambulance workers ===
==== Ambulance workers in England ====
On 6 December, ambulance workers belonging to the GMB, Unison and Unite announced two one-day strikes on 21 and 28 December; the strikes would affect non-life-threatening calls. On 18 January 2023, a further four strike days were announced, including 6 February, which would coincide with a walkout by nurses, creating the largest strike within the NHS so far.

On 3 March 2023, the GMB and Unison unions called off ambulance strikes in England scheduled for 6 and 8 March after the UK government agreed to reopen talks on pay for the 2022–23 and 2023–24 financial years. Unite said their strikes would still go ahead after they refused to join any talks, citing unreasonable conditions from the government for their decision. However, on 5 March, Unite announced it had called off the strikes to enter into discussions with the government.

==== Ambulance workers in Wales ====
On 20 February 2023, three days of strikes involving almost half of ambulance workers in Wales began, with members of the GMB union walking out on 20 February, and members of the Unite union walking out on 21 and 22 February. On 21 February, ambulance workers belonging to the Unite union called two further strikes for 6 and 10 March. On 3 March, the Unite and GMB unions called off a planned strike by the Welsh Ambulance Service scheduled for Monday 6 March after "significant progress" in talks with the Welsh Government. On 8 March, members of the Welsh Ambulance Service belonging to the Unite union called off a strike scheduled for Friday 10 March following "progress" with officials from the Welsh Government.

=== Royal College of Midwives ===
On 13 September 2023, and following a long standing dispute, the Royal College of Midwives announced a 24-hour strike in Northern Ireland for 22 September. The union also said its members would claim payment for any overtime worked in the week after the strike. Strike action had been threatened earlier in 2023, but paused as negotiations continued. On 19 December, the Royal College of Midwives announced a one day strike for midwives and maternity support workers on 18 January 2024.

=== NHS staff ===
==== NHS staff in England ====
On 16 March 2023, NHS staff in England, including nurses and ambulance staff, were offered a 5% pay rise from April, along with a one-off payment of £1,655 to cover backdated pay. The offer did not include doctors, who are on a different contract. Union leaders said they would recommend their members accept the offer. On 14 April, UNISON confirmed its members working for the NHS had voted unanimously to accept the 5% pay offer from the UK government.

On 26 April 2023, the Royal College of Midwives announced that its members had voted to accept the government's pay offer for NHS workers in England. On 28 April, members of the Unite union, mostly ambulance workers and junior healthcare staff, rejected the UK government's 5% pay offer. Around half of the 55% who voted chose to reject it. On the same day, the pay offer was backed by members of the GMB union. On 2 May, the 5% pay increase for the one million NHS staff in England was signed off at a meeting between the UK government and representatives from 14 trade unions; all NHS employees apart from doctors and dentists were represented at the meeting.

==== NHS staff in Wales ====
On 12 May 2023, NHS workers in Wales belonging to the Unison trade union voted to accept a 5% pay increase from the Welsh Government along with a one-off payment worth between £900 and £1,190.

==== HSC staff in Northern Ireland ====
Health and social care staff belonging to Unite, Unison and the Northern Ireland Public Service Alliance (Nipsa) began a 48-hour strike on 21 September 2023. The industrial action involved some nurses, ambulance workers and hospital support staff. They were joined by members of the Royal College of Midwives on 22 September, who staged a 24-hour strike over a long-running dispute.

== Telecommunications ==
On 30 June, CWU members working for BT Group voted to take industrial action over pay, with strike action expected to involve around 40,000 of the company's frontline workers, mostly engineering and call centre staff, and would be BT's first nationwide industrial action since 1987. Two days of strike action were subsequently announced for 29 July and 1 August, and went ahead as scheduled. Another two-day strike was held on 30 and 31 August.

On 28 November, it was reported that BT bosses had reached an agreement with union bosses that would give workers earning less than £50,000 a year an annual pay increase worth 16%, or £1,500.

== Education ==
In summer 2022, the government announced below inflation pay rises, which lead to a series of strike ballots by education unions.

=== Schools ===
==== Schools in England ====
On 19 June, The Observer reported that the National Education Union would ballot its 450,000 members on industrial action if teachers did not receive a pay rise close to the rate of inflation, while it was also reported that Unison had warned of industrial action among medical staff if they were not offered a pay rise.

On 14 October, the UK's two largest teaching unions, the National Education Union and National Association of Schoolmasters and Union of Women Teachers (NASUWT) announced plans to ballot their members on strike action after receiving the offer of a 3.5% pay rise from the Department for Education. Both unions have demanded a 12% pay rise to keep pace with the level of inflation. On 12 January 2023, the NASUWT announced that despite nine out of ten members who voted opting for industrial action, members working in state funded schools would not be striking due to a 42% turnout; 8% less than the 50% turnout ratio required by the government. On 16 January the National Education Union announced that its members had voted to strike, and confirmed that seven days of strike action would be held in February and March; three national strikes in England and Wales would be held on 1 and 15 February, and 15 March, as well as four days on which regional strike action would take place. The UK government made a renewed pay offer to teachers in England following discussions and which would be put to a ballot, but on 27 March, the National Education Union urged teachers to reject the offer, raising the prospect of further strikes. Gillian Keegan, the Secretary of State for Education, said the deal, with a £1,000 one-off payment for 2022–23 and a 4.3 pay rise for 2023–24, would be the government's final offer. On 3 April, the NEU announced two further strike dates on 27 April and 2 May, stating that the offer was unacceptable, not fully funded, and did not address the shortage of teachers. The pay offer was also subsequently rejected by the National Association of Head Teachers (NAHT) and the Association of School and College Leaders (ASCL). On 8 April, the NASUWT announced it would ballot its members on strike action after 87% of those who voted rejected the government's pay offer for teachers in England, which the union said failed to address concerns over pay and conditions.

On 28 April 2023, four teaching unions in England – the National Education Union, NASUWT, National Association of Head Teachers and the Association of School and College Leaders – announced plans to co-ordinate strike action, something that BBC News reported could lead to schools being completely shut down later in the year. At the time of the announcement, only the National Education Union had the mandate to strike, but the other unions confirmed they would ballot their members on whether to take strike action. A day of strike action was held by the National Education Union on 2 May 2023 throughout England, with data from the Department for Education suggesting it had impacted more schools than on previous occasions.

On 17 June 2023, the National Education Union announced a national strike in England on 5 and 7 July.

On 12 July 2023, members of the NASUWT teaching union in England voted to stage strike action over pay, with 85.5% of members voting to do so on a 51.9% turnout. But on 13 July, the UK government proposed a 6.5% pay rise for teachers in England, with the leaders of all four major teaching unions expressing support for the increase, meaning strikes by teachers in England would be likely to end. On 21 July, it was announced that members of the Association of School and College Leaders, which represents headteachers in England, had voted to accept the 6.5% pay rise, with 87% of those who took part in the ballot voting to accept the offer. On 31 July, the National Education Union announced that its members had voted to accept the 6.5% pay increase, with 86% of those eligible to vote backing the offer. Education Secretary Gillian Keegan described the announcement as "good news" for teachers, parents and schoolchildren.

==== Schools in Northern Ireland ====
On 23 November 2023, the Unite union announced that school support staff in Northern Ireland would stage a strike over pay on 1 December. Nipsa and Unite scheduled strike action for school support staff on 3 and 4 June 2024, but announced the suspension of the strikes on 1 June.

On 20 March, members of three teaching unions – NASUWT, INTO and NAHT – voted to accept a pay offer proposed by Education Minister Paul Givan that included increasing the starting salary of a teacher from £24,000 to £30,000.

==== Schools in Scotland ====
In Scotland, non-teaching staff in 11 council areas were scheduled to stage a three-day strike in early September, but this was called off after the Unison, Unite and GMB unions agreed a pay deal.

On 10 November, the Educational Institute of Scotland (EIS), Scotland's largest Teaching Union voted overwhelmingly in favour of strike action after receiving a pay offer of 5%. 96% of members voted yes to strike action on a turnout of 71%. The first strike action was scheduled for 24 November. On 22 November, a revised 6.85% pay offer was rejected by the EIS, meaning the industrial action would go ahead. In January 2023, the EIS announced a further 22 days of strike action. This commenced with 16 days of "rolling" strike action, whereby each day would see teachers in two local authorities striking; Glasgow and East Lothian were the first two areas to be affected.

Members of the Scottish Secondary Teachers' Association (SSTA) were scheduled to stage a strike in February 2023, but after they voted to accept a new pay offer from the Scottish Government, it was announce on 25 February that they had suspended the strike action scheduled for the following week. On 3 March, the Educational Institute of Scotland and other teaching unions called off a planned 20 days of rolling strikes scheduled to begin on 13 March after receiving an improved pay offer from the Scottish Government, worth 14.6% over 28 months. The proposals were then put to a ballot. On 4 March, the NASUWT said it would ballot its members on the offer. On 10 March, members of the Educational Institute of Scotland voted to accept the pay deal, thus bringing their strike action to an end. On 14 March, members of the NASUWT narrowly voted to accept the pay offer, ending the prospect of further strike action in schools in Scotland.

On 7 August 2023, the Unite union announced that its members working in education and early years in ten council areas had voted to take rolling industrial action over pay after rejecting a pay offer worth 99p an hour, raising their hourly rate to £11.84. The strike action would involve employees including janitors, cleaners, caterers, classroom assistants and administrative staff.

On 17 August, GMB Scotland announced that non-teaching staff in ten Scottish council areas would stage two days of strike action on 13 and 14 September. On 25 August, members of Unison in 24 of Scotland's 32 council areas voted to take industrial action after rejecting a 5.5% pay offer. The strike action would affect catering, cleaning, pupil support, administration and janitorial staff in schools and early years centres. On 14 September, a fresh offer from Cosla that would see workers receive an extra £1,929 by 1 January 2024 was rejected by Unison and the GMB. On 21 September, Unison confirmed strikes would take place on 26, 27 and 28 September in 24 council areas. Last minute talks over the weekend preceding these dates also failed to bring about a resolution.

On 1 November 2023, UNISON announced that non-teaching staff at schools in Dundee City, Stirling, Clackmannanshire, Angus and Perth and Kinross would strike on 15 November, with further dates to be confirmed later. On 3 November, Unison suspended further strike action after receiving a revised pay offer from the Scottish Government, which it planned to putto its members.

==== Schools in Wales ====
On 10 March, members of the National Education Union in Wales called off two strikes planned for 15 and 16 March after receiving a new pay offer from the Welsh Government. On 23 March, they voted to accept the pay offer, worth 8%, ending their industrial dispute.

=== Universities ===
On 24 October, the UK's largest higher education union, the UCU voted in favour of strike action in a national ballot. On 8 November, the UCU announced three days of strike action on 24, 25 and 30 November. On 12 January 2023, a further 18 days of strike action were announced through February and March, and were expected to affect 150 universities in the UK. On 17 February, the University and College Union announced that seven days of strikes planned for February and March had been called off after "significant progress" was made in discussions with their employers. On 14 August, the UCU announced that strikes would continue into the new term in September after talks between the union and employers broke down.

On 26 June 2023, UCU members at Stirling University announced a three-day strike beginning from the following day, after claiming their wages had been cut by 50% to taking part in a UK-wide marking boycott taking place at 145 universities and that began in April 2023. Another strike was due to commence on 11 September, with staff striking on weekdays for three weeks.

== Refuse workers ==
=== Edinburgh ===
On 18 August, and following a pay dispute with the Convention of Scottish Local Authorities (COSLA), refuse workers belonging to the Unison, Unite and GMB trade unions launched industrial action in Edinburgh. The 12-day strike began as the city played host to the 2022 Edinburgh Festival and led Public Health Scotland to issue a public health warning because of uncollected rubbish in urban areas. The walkout ended at 04:59 on 30 August. On 29 August, the three trade unions involved in the dispute announced plans for a second strike.

On 1 September, First Minister of Scotland Nicola Sturgeon met with council leaders and trade union leaders to resolve the dispute. On 2 September, the strikes were called off by the three unions involved after a 10% pay deal was agreed upon.

=== Cardiff ===
On 4 September 2023, refuse workers at Cardiff City Council belonging to the Unite union began a strike, affecting the collection of hygiene and garden waste. On 22 November, Unite confirmed the strike would end on 26 November, but said it may stage further industrial action. A second, four-week strike commenced on 28 December, forcing Cardiff City Council to cancel the collection and recycling of Christmas trees.

=== Scotland ===
After rejecting a pay offer in May 2024, it was announced on 2 July that waste and recycling staff belonging to Unite in half of Scotland's councils had voted to strike. On 17 July, it was announced that members of Unison at 14 Scottish council areas, including Glasgow, Perth and Kinross and Dumfries and Galloway, had voted to take industrial action after describing a pay offer from Cosla as "inadequate". On 19 July, Unison rejected the latest offer from Cosla aimed at preventing strikes by refuse collectors, which was worth 3.2%. On 22 July, Unite and the GMB also rejected Cosla's pay offer. On 30 July, Unison confirms that strike action would take place from 14 to 22 August. On 31 July, the Unite and GMB unions announced eight days of strike action for refuse workers beginning on 14 August, which would include those working for Edinburgh City Council and occur during the Edinburgh Festival. On 8 August, Cosla puts forward a new offer of a 3.6% increase for all grades of refuse workers in a bid to prevent strikes in 26 of Scotland's 32 council areas. The offer would represent a rise of £1,292 for the lowest paid, equivalent to a 5.63% increase. On 12 August, Unison, Unite and the GMB suspended their planned strikes following the new offer from Cosla. On 3 September, Unison announced that 86% of those who voted on the pay increase had chosen to reject it.

== Firefighters ==
On 30 January 2023, it was confirmed that members of the Fire Brigades Union (FBU) had voted to take strike action over pay following a ballot earlier in the month in which 80% of those who had voted had favoured strike action. The FBU said it would not announce any strike dates until it had spoken with its members. On 9 February, it was announced that industrial action by firefighters had been called off after the pay offer was revised.

== Others ==
=== PCS strikes ===
On 29 November, members of the Public and Commercial Services Union (PCS) announced a series of rolling strikes from 13 December to 16 January 2023. The strikes will involve driving examiners and rural payment officers at 250 sites. As of January 2023, the PCS had announced over 120 government departments which had voted for strike action. On 11 January the PCS announced that around 100,000 civil servants at 124 government departments would hold a one-day strike on 1 February. On 27 March 2023, another strike was called by the PCS for 28 April, involving around 130,000 civil servants.

On 11 June 2023, staff at the Driver and Vehicle Licensing Agency (DVLA) in Swansea belonging to the PCS union began a 15-day strike.

=== Prospect strikes ===
Following a government offer of a 4.5% pay rise for civil servants (with an extra 0.5% for lower paid employees), the Prospect trade union announced on 14 April 2023 that two strikes would be staged on 10 May and 7 June. On 26 May, the union announced it had paused further strike action after the UK government had offered to engage in "meaningful talks" over pay.

=== Environment Agency ===
On 14 April 2023, several thousand workers with the Environment Agency belonging to the UNISON trade union began a three-day strike over pay and conditions.

=== Passport Office ===
On 3 April 2023, members of the Public and Commercial Services Union working at the Passport Office began a five-week strike over pay and conditions.

=== Financial Conduct Authority ===
On 4 May, members of Unite embarked on historic strike action at the Financial Conduct Authority (FCA) in London and Edinburgh the first such action since the inception of the regulator. It followed a vote in April 2022 when 75% of FCA staff with Unite memberships voted in favour of the action against the regulator over disputes around changes to pay and conditions as well as the FCA's refusal to recognise Unite. The FCA rejected all approaches to engage in discussions with employee representatives and attempts by the union to reach a settlement.

A May 2022 decision by the Central Arbitration Committee ruled that Unite's statutory recognition application was not admissible, as it did not have enough support from the workforce.

A second wave of strike action took place on 9 June and 10 June with significant political support from the Labour Party front bench including Rachel Reeves the Shadow Chancellor of the Exchequer, Angela Rayner the Shadow Chancellor of the Duchy of Lancaster and Tulip Siddiq the Shadow Treasury Minister.

A third wave of two-day strike action planned for July 2022 was paused, after Unite announced it was exploring options with the regulator to secure a route to union recognition. However, this was not to materialise, and on 7 December, Unite called on the FCA to have a staff-led action plan, which includes recognising the union, changes to performance and health benefit contributions scaled to pay.

On 8 March 2023, the new FCA Chair, Ashley Alder, and FCA CEO Nikhil Rathi, appeared before a Treasury Committee, hearing where Emma Hardy MP told the FCA to stop blocking information about trade unions internally, including FCA employees' ability to share links to the Unite union's website.

In April 2023, in a follow-up letter to the House of Commons Treasury Select Committee after its 8 March 2023 evidence session the FCA said that it had, in December 2022 after the Arbitration Committee ruling, invited Unite and the FDA to each take a seat on the FCA's Staff Consultative Committee (SCC), while it worked on enhanced staff-engagement arrangements. FCA Board minutes from February 2024 also recorded that the Board had received a letter from Unite on pay and engagement through the SCC. In the same period, Unite publicly criticised the FCA's 2024 pay offer as inadequate relative to inflation and living costs, while the regulator disputed aspects of the claim and said the number of staff below the Joseph Rowntree Foundation's minimum income standard was limited and largely comprised apprentices.

In July 2025, Unite warned that it could consider industrial action if the FCA increased mandatory office attendance beyond the then 40% threshold, citing morale, retention, and equality impacts. In January 2026, media reported that the FCA had informed staff of a revised hybrid-working policy requiring most employees to spend at least 50% of their time in FCA offices (with directors and executive directors expected to be in the office 60% of the time) from September 2026.

=== Broadcasting ===
==== BBC Local Radio ====
On 19 January 2023, and following the announcement of cuts to BBC Local Radio, it was announced that members of the National Union of Journalists would hold a consultative ballot on whether to take strike action over the proposed changes. On 31 January, the NUJ reported that a consultative ballot had favoured strike action, with industrial action potentially beginning on the week of 13 March. On 28 February, members of the National Union of Journalists working for the BBC regional service in England voted to take strike action over planned cuts to BBC Local Radio. A 24-hour strike was scheduled for 15 March to coincide with Budget Day. The strike went ahead as scheduled, beginning at 11am and requiring a syndicated programme to air in some areas rather than the usual local programming.

After the latest BBC concessions were rejected, on 16 May 2023, it was confirmed that members of the National Union of Journalists at BBC Local Radio would stage a 48-hour strike over proposed changes to the service on 7 and 8 June. On 14 November, it was confirmed that members of the National Union of Journalists had voted to end their dispute over changes to BBC Local Radio, with 70% of the 55% turnout accepting a deal with BBC management.

==== BBC Northern Ireland ====
On 9 March 2023, the National Union of Journalists announced plans to hold a strike ballot among staff at Northern Ireland's BBC Radio Foyle following a management decision to implement schedule changes, which included replacing the two hour morning programme with a 30-minute version. Union officials had been negotiating with management over the proposed changes, but the talks had ended a few days earlier, on 6 March, when it was decided the changes would go ahead. On 31 March, a second strike was called for 4 May to coincide with the 2023 local elections. On 27 April, that strike was called off following talks between the NUJ and the BBC. The NUJ said it would ballot its members on a new pay offer.

On 12 May 2023, members of the National Union of Journalists at BBC Radio Foyle announced a 24-hour strike over planned changes to the service, with the strike set to commence at 12.15am on 19 May.

=== Distribution ===
On 25 January 2023, the first ever strike by UK employees of Amazon took place, with 300 staff at a warehouse in Coventry staging a one-day walk out, in a dispute over pay and conditions. On 13 February, the GMB union announced a further series of strikes at the distribution centre during February and March. The GMB wants workers to be paid £15 per hour rather than the current £10.50. Amazon does not recognise the union, and so has refused to enter into negotiations with its representatives. On 16 April, around 600 Amazon workers based at Coventry and belonging to the GMB trade union began a three-day strike over pay.

On 14 June 2023, the GMB confirmed workers at Amazon in Coventry had voted for a further six months of industrial action. Another strike was held on 24 November to coincide with Black Friday. On this occasion, Amazon workers in Coventry were joined by colleagues in Europe and the United States. Amazon said the strike would not affect customers' deliveries.

=== Rugby union ===
In January 2023, discussions between the Welsh Rugby Players Association and the Professional Rugby Board commenced after a long-running dispute over pay and the terms on which players in Wales could represent the Wales national rugby union team. On 16 February, it was reported the national team were considering strike action on 25 February, the date of a scheduled Six Nations Championship match against England. Alun Wyn Jones a member of the team, said that striking would be a "last resort" but that it was "hard to deny" it as a possibility. Warren Gatland, Wales's head coach, said that he would not support his players going on strike. Gatland was scheduled to name the line up of the Wales team for the game at midday on 21 February, but the announcement was delayed as the threat of strike action continued. On 22 February, an agreement was reached between players and the Welsh Rugby Union (WRU), confirming that the fixture would go ahead, and the Welsh team was announced the following day.

=== Offshore workers ===
On 7 April 2023, the Scottish branch of the Unite union announced that around 1,300 offshore workers would stage a 48-hour strike from 24 April over pay, affecting production at dozens of North Sea oil and gas platforms.

=== Rosyth Dockyard ===
On 7 April 2023, around 100 workers at Rosyth Dockyard belonging to Unite voted to strike between 17 April and 10 July in a disagreement with their employers, Kafaer, over pay. Union bosses said the stoppage could cause "significant delays" to Royal frigates during the strike.

=== Welsh Government ===
On 17 April 2023, employees of the Welsh Government and Natural Resources Wales belonging to the Prospect union announced plans to strike on 11 May and 7 June over pay.

=== Music festivals ===
On 21 June 2023, the Doune the Rabbit Hole festival, scheduled to take place in Stirling on 21 July, was cancelled after BECTU called for a boycott.

=== NIPSA ===
On 2 July 2023, Carmen Gates, the General Secretary of the Northern Ireland Public Service Alliance, told the BBC's Sunday Politics programme that civil servants in Northern Ireland were considering a general strike in September after being offered an annual £552 pay increase, which had left them feeling "insulted and angry" and "very badly treated by the secretary of state".

On 18 December 2023, approximately 50 health system warehouse workers belonging to the Nipsa union began a five-day strike over pay and safe staffing levels.

=== Scottish Water ===
On 1 September, both Unite and Unison confirmed their members at Scottish Water had voted in favour of taking industrial action over pay. The unions said that Scottish Water had tried to set out a pay offer without consulting or negotiating with them. Unite said that 92% of those who voted were in favour of taking strike action, while Unison said 82% of their members who voted favoured taking action. On 10 November, around 500 employees of Scottish Water belonging to the GMB, Unite and Unison trade unions, began a four day strike over a pay dispute. A spokesman for the workers said they had been "driven to strike action" by Scottish Water's refusal to settle the pay dispute.

=== Council workers in Wales ===
On 4 September, council workers in Cardiff, Wrexham and Gwynedd belonging to the Unite union began strike action over pay. The strikes began in Cardiff and Wrexham on 4 September, and were due to finish on 17 September, while those in Gwynedd walked out for a week beginning 11 September. On 12 September, Unite announced that workers in Cardiff and Wrexham would strike for an additional three weeks from 25 September to 15 October.

=== Gritters in Northern Ireland ===
On 15 January 2024, road gritters belonging to the GMB and Unite unions announced a week-long strike from Thursday 18 January, coinciding with a period of cold weather and snow in Northern Ireland.

=== Public sector in Northern Ireland ===
On 18 January 2024, around 100,000 public sector workers in Northern Ireland staged a one-day strike, affecting services such as public transport, education and healthcare. Demonstrations also took place in Belfast, Derry, Omagh and Enniskillen in what was described by BBC News as Northern Ireland's largest strike for 50 years.

=== Food delivery app drivers ===
On 12 February 2024, it was reported that drivers working for food delivery apps such as Deliveroo, Just Eat and Uber Eats would stage a five-hour strike on 14 February over pay and conditions. BBC News reported the strike would involve around 3,000 drivers. On 14 February, and ahead of that evening's strike, a group calling itself Delivery Jobs UK warned that drivers would strike every Friday and on holidays if their concerns were not addressed, with around 4,000 drivers reported to be involved.

In September 2024, The Guardian reported that Deliveroo riders claim they were still being paid below a minimum pay floor (£12 per hour plus vehicle expenses) agreed with the GMB union in May, when factoring in wait times and lack of demand.

In April 2024, the UK government announced Deliveroo, Just Eat, and Uber Eats had agreed to strengthen right-to-work checks for delivery riders, after enforcement activity found significant levels of illegal working on delivery platforms and ministers argued this could suppress wages and facilitate exploitation. Further strengthening of these verification mechanisms were announced in July 2025. Reuters later reported that a week-long enforcement operation (20 to 27 July 2025) involved 1,780 checks and 280 arrests for illegal working as delivery riders, and that the government said targeted operations in sectors including food delivery contributed to a year-on-year increase in illegal-working arrests in the 12 months to September 2025.

=== Trade union employees ===
On 21 March 2024, it was reported that staff at the GMB had voted to strike over claims the organisation had failed to act on a report compiled by Karon Monaghan KC, which described the trade union as "institutionally sexist". A strike was subsequently scheduled for 8 April, but on 6 April the strike was called off.

=== Office for National Statistics ===
On 5 April 2024, the PCS union announced that members working for the Office for National Statistics had voted to strike over plans requiring them to return to the office for at least 40% of the time after they worked from home during the COVID-19 pandemic. The ballot saw a 50% turnout, with 70% of those who voted choosing to take industrial action.

=== Steelworkers ===
On 11 April 2024, steelworkers belonging to the Unite union voted to take industrial action over Tata Steel's UK restructuring plans, which would see the loss of 3,000 jobs at its Port Talbot and Llanwern sites. On 9 May, members of Community, the UK's largest steelworkers' trade union, vote to take industrial action over Tata Steel's plans for restructuring, with 85% of those who voted in favour of industrial action. On 30 May, Unite announced plans to begin industrial action on 18 June. On 21 June, Unite announced that 1,500 steelworkers at Tata Steel would begin an indefinite strike in July. On 27 June, Tata Steel warned it was taking steps to cease operations at much of the Port Talbot plant by 7 July if the strike was to go ahead. On 1 July, Unite called off the strike action scheduled to begin at the Port Talbot Steelworks on 8 July so that further discussions could take place over the future of the plant.

=== Distillery staff ===
On 20 June 2024, the GMB announced a series of strikes for staff at three facilities belonging to Whyte & Mackay beginning on 24 June after staff at the whisky distillery rejected the company's latest pay offer. A one-day strike was scheduled for 24 June, followed by 11 days of strikes in July, and two weeks of stoppages in August.

== Commentary ==
=== Bank of England ===
On 9 February 2023, Andrew Bailey, the governor of the Bank of England said that as it was the view of the bank that inflation would "fall very rapidly" during the year, and that this should be taken into account by public sector workers when asking for pay rises. The bank's prediction is that it will drop from 10.5% to 4% by the end of the year. Bailey maintained he thought headline inflation was improving, it had fallen. Bailey added "but we need to see more evidence that this will take effect."

=== Institute for Fiscal Studies ===
Also in February 2023, the Institute for Fiscal Studies (IFS) said that it anticipated the government would borrow roughly £30bn less in 2023 than it had predicted in November 2022. £6bn would probably be spent on a fuel duty freeze, but borrowing would still be almost £25bn lower than previously anticipated. The IFS added that the gap between public and private sector pay had widened a great deal during the recent rise in inflation and "it is difficult... to see an end to public sector pay disputes that does not involve the Treasury providing some extra cash to departments" The IFS also said a 5.5% increase in pay throughout the public sector would match the Consumer price index and would cost around £5bn, this was small compared to the recent underspend. The IFS added "Most obviously, the impact of injecting £5bn into an economy with an annual GDP well in excess of £2,000bn would surely be modest." Paul Johnson of the IFS said fears raising public sector pay would fuel inflation were exaggerated. The IFS said increasing the current 3.5% average pay offer to 5.5% could cost less than £5bn rather than the £28bn Hunt suggested.

=== Journalists ===
Martin Wolf of the Financial Times maintained in December 2022 that since 2010 real average pay rose 5.5% in the private sector till September 2022, but fell 5.9% in the public sector. This adversely affected recruitment and retention of staff as well as causing strikes. Wolf said the government should keep public sector pay comparable with private sector pay particularly where there are noteworthy recruitment and retention issues.

In November 2022 James Smith of the London School of Hygiene & Tropical Medicine, Ryan Essex of the University of Greenwich and Rita Issa of University College London wrote in The Lancet that pay had not risen in a way that compensated for a worsening cost of living crisis and this clearly motivated strike action. Public sector workers stated their demands while there was under-investment in essential public services and their workforce. Private sector workers made pay demands while there was high corporate profit.

=== Trades Union Congress ===
The TUC said in October 2022 that almost two million public sector workers "could be close" to leaving due to "poor pay", this could cause crisis in the UK public services. Also in October 2022, the TUC stated millions of key workers helped the UK manage the worst of the Covid pandemic, but had the prospect of another year of "pay misery" due to the government, as the cost of living rose. Frances O'Grady former TUC general secretary, stated that many were "at breaking point" due to low pay, unmanagable workloads and "lack of recognition". The TUC referred to YouGov research, which found one third of the public sector workers surveyed were either considering leaving or had already taken steps to do so. The TUC feared this could amount to 1.8 million people nationwide. O'Grady stated following years of severe pay cuts, nurses, teachers, refuse workers and millions of other public servants experienced their living standards severely reduced. The TUC stated the 2022 low pay awards came after a decade of pay cuts for key public sector workers. Living costs were increasingly burdensome, which the October 2022 United Kingdom government crisis by Liz Truss worsened. The TUC maintained real pay was falling in the public sector and large parts of the private sector. O'Grady stated the government would be at fault if there were large scale public sector strike action during the months following October 2022. O'Grady stated the government were holding public sector pay down but allowing bankers unlimited bonuses.

Following a January 2023 tax receipt that was higher than forecast by the Office for Budget Responsibility (OBR), the government had a £5.4bn revenue surplus for the month. In February 2022, the TUC urged chancellor Jeremy Hunt to use the revenue to offer higher pay rises to public sector workers to end strike deadlock. Paul Nowak of the TUC said this showed the government could break the deadlock on strikes. Nowak said that without what he considered "a fair pay settlement" staffing shortages harming schools, hospitals and other frontline services would worsen. Hunt said public finances were under pressure, and that he would prioritise reducing debt and reducing debt interest payments. Ruth Gregory of Capital Economics stated that Hunt had the opportunity to introduce "tax cuts and/or spending rises".
