= Phélim Mac Cafferty =

Northern Irish politician (born 1979)

Leader of Brighton and Hove City Council
- In office 23 July 2020 – 4 May 2023
- Deputy: Hannah Clare; Sue Shanks
- Preceded by: Nancy Platts

Green Group Leader on Brighton and Hove City Council
- In office 12 May 2015 – 4 May 2023
- Preceded by: Jason Kitcat

Brighton and Hove City Councillor for Brunswick and Adelaide
- In office 5 May 2011 – 4 May 2023
- Preceded by: Paul Elgood

Personal details
- Born: 15 February 1979 (age 47) Derry, Northern Ireland
- Party: Green

Phélim Mac Cafferty (born 15 February 1979) is a former Green Party of England and Wales politician and the former leader of Brighton and Hove City Council, in Brighton and Hove, England. He served as a councillor for the Brunswick and Adelaide ward from 2011 until 2023 when he lost his seat.

== Biography ==
Mac Cafferty was born on 15 February 1979 in Derry in Northern Ireland. He was previously a spokesperson for the Green Party on LGBT issues. Prior to his election as a councillor, he worked for the Institute of Employment Rights, a trade union think tank. He has a PhD in architecture and the built environment.He is an account director at the Community Communications Partnership.

== Political biography ==
He was the Green candidate for the Brunswick and Adelaide ward in 2007 finishing behind the Lib Dems. He stood again in 2011 and was successful.

=== Green Administration (2011–2015) ===
Mac Cafferty was elected as part of the Green Party's first ever administration of a council in the United Kingdom in 2011 following the 2011 Brighton and Hove City Council elections. It followed a year after the election of the UK's (at the time) only Green Member of Parliament, Caroline Lucas, who represented the Brighton Pavilion constituency. He had a number of significant roles in the council, including Chair of the Planning Committee and Deputy Leader.

In 2013, an unsuccessful attempt was made to oust council leader Jason Kitcat and replace him with Mac Cafferty. He stood unsuccessfully for the position in 2014, where he narrowly lost out to Jason Kitcat.

=== Convenor of Green Group (2015–2023) ===
After the 2015 Brighton and Hove City Council election where the Green Party lost control of the council and became the smallest party, Mac Cafferty was elected as Convenor of the Green Group of Councillors. As convenor, he oversaw the Green's period of opposition on the council between 2015 - 2020, after which the Green Party returned to minority control of Brighton and Hove City Council.

=== UK and European parliamentary elections (2017 and 2019) ===
He stood unsuccessfully for the Green Party in the Hove Parliamentary Constituency at the 2017 UK general election, where incumbent Peter Kyle was re-elected.

In 2019, Mac Cafferty was fifth on the Green Party's South-East England list for the 2019 European Parliament elections, where fellow Brighton and Hove councillor Alexandra Phillips was elected as a Member of European Parliament.

=== Leader of Council (2020–2023) ===
In 2019 Brighton and Hove City Council elections, the Green Party elected 19 councillors, becoming the official opposition. The Labour Party elected 20 councillors and therefore narrowly held onto power.

In July 2020, the Labour Party lost control of the council, following two resignations. Mac Cafferty became the first Green to lead Brighton and Hove City Council since 2015. In his first speech as leader, Mac Cafferty recognised the city's deaths' during the COVID-19 pandemic.

In 2021, a by-election in Hollingdean and Stanmer ward was won by the Green Party candidate Zoë John, bringing the total of Green Councillors to 20. It was the first time since 2004 that the ruling party in Brighton and Hove gained a seat in a by-election.

In November 2021, Mac Cafferty was criticised for flying to the COP26 climate change summit in Glasgow and later apologised, blaming "the unreliability of the rail network"; he described his decision to do so as a "major failure of my judgement" and admitted that it went against his party's principles.

As a result of the May 2023 local elections the Green Party lost 13 seats including Mac Cafferty's, leading the Labour Party to secure the first council majority in Brighton since 2003.

== Notable policies ==
=== Primary school re-opening ===
During the COVID-19 pandemic in January 2021, Brighton and Hove City Council advised its primary schools to not re-open following the winter holidays, against Government advice. Mac Cafferty wrote to education secretary Gavin Williamson asking him to close all primary schools in England. The council's decision was put to Prime Minister Boris Johnson on the Andrew Marr Show just one day before the UK Government later issued advice for primary schools to close.

=== Climate change ===
Brighton and Hove City Council held a climate assembly in September 2019, commissioning Ipsos MORI. They published ten recommendations in early 2021 which formed the council's plan to reach carbon neutrality by 2030 and led to the Green Council investing more than £27 million in climate adaptation measures in their 2021 budget.

The carbon neutral plan was criticised by some for the inclusion of a proposed ban on disposable BBQs on the city's beaches.
