= 2022 British barristers' industrial action =

Industrial action by Bar Association

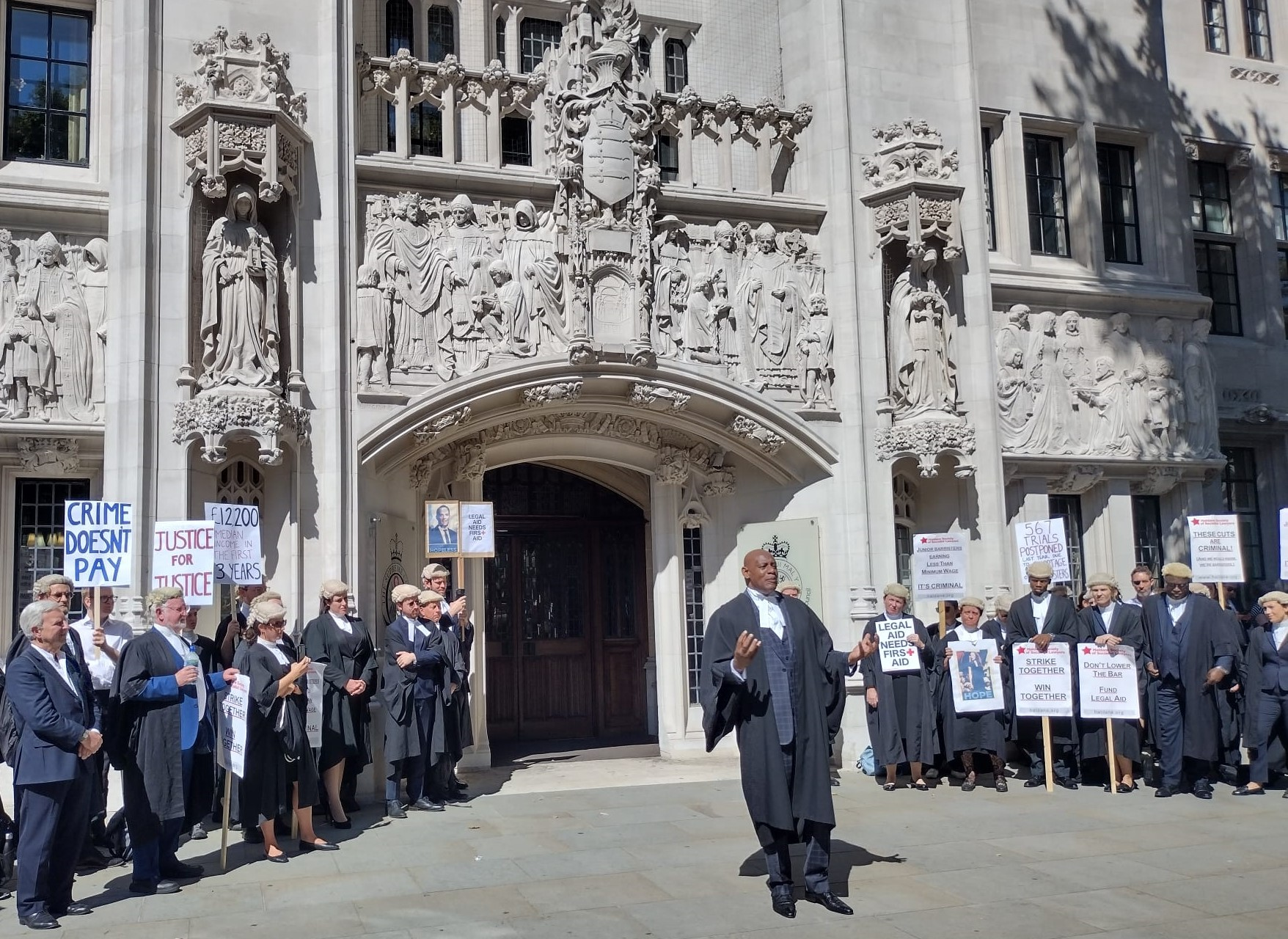
Barrister and TV personality Shaun Wallace addresses a rally supporting the industrial action outside the Supreme Court, London, 11 July 2022

On 14 March 2022, the Criminal Bar Association (CBA) in England and Wales voted to undertake industrial action protesting against stagnant fees with 94% of criminal barristers in favour. The industrial action consisted of refusal to accept returns—substitution of a new barrister, often at the last minute, when another of them is unavailable to make a trial date—in cases funded by the Advocates' Graduated Fee Scheme (AGFS) (legal aid) in the Crown Court. The action began on 11 April 2022. Almost 2,500 people participated in the action. The CBA did not consider the initial action a strike because its members are under no obligation to accept returns, which it calls "a gesture of goodwill to prop up the criminal justice system". Two months later, in June 2022, barristers began an open-ended strike every other week based on a CBA ballot in late May. In October 2022, during the premiership of Liz Truss, barristers voted to end the strike following a deal with the Secretary of State for Justice, Brandon Lewis.

== Background ==
In England and Wales, criminal barristers are self-employed professionals who represent the state and defendants in criminal trials. Barristers are not paid for preparation work; 23 percent work more than 60 hours a week and the average salary for the first three years is £12,200. For the last 25 years, legal aid rates have been frozen or cut. According to the CBA, real wages of barristers fell 28 percent over two decades. In 2014, barristers called their first ever strike for a half day to protest cuts to the legal aid budget. 25 percent of barristers have left the profession since 2017 and an additional 25 percent plan to quit. Due to lack of barristers, 280 trials could not be held in the three months prior to 2022. The action was considered likely to increase the case backlog, which stood at 60,000 cases in April 2022 having doubled since March 2019. The average delay had reached almost two years. The Times reported that 83 percent of criminal barristers "incurred personal debt or used savings during the coronavirus pandemic". The strikes occurred with other industrial disputes across the UK, caused by the UK cost of living crisis. In November 2021, Nigel Lithman QC, who had led the 2014 strike, saw no alternative to fresh industrial action. CBA members had voted for this in 2019 but called it off because of the independent review.

== Initial industrial action ==
The goal of the action was to increase remuneration for barristers. An independent review by Sir Christopher Bellamy QC, called after some had predicted the collapse of the system, had recommended at least a 15 percent salary increase at a cost of £135m to keep the criminal justice system operational. On 15 March, the government announced that it planned to carry out this wage increase in October 2022 and asked barristers not to strike. The CBA did not call off the strike as it said the increase was insufficient to retain barristers; it said that the proposal only amounted to 9 percent pay increase while its members voted for a 25 percent pay increase.

The industrial action consists of refusal to accept returns—substitution of a new barrister, often at the last minute, when another of them is unavailable to make a trial date—in Advocates' Graduated Fee Scheme (AGFS) (legal aid)-funded cases in the Crown Court. Almost 2,500 people participated in the initial action. The CBA did not consider the action a strike because its members are under no obligation to accept returns, which it calls “a gesture of goodwill to prop up the criminal justice system”. The action began on 11 April and was open ended.

== June 2022 strike ==
In late April, the London Criminal Courts Solicitors Association was considering industrial action in solidarity with barristers and demanding a 25 percent wage increase for solicitors. Some solicitors began a boycott of low-paid work in May. In late May the Criminal Bar Association was organizing another ballot to gauge support for escalating the industrial action, with results to be announced 20 June.

On 27 June, barristers walked out in a strike action. They planned to increase strikes until August at which point they would be on strike every other week. The strike was open ended.

== August 2022 escalation ==
On 22 August 2022 the result of a further ballot was announced. That ballot was to determine whether the existing action should be escalated to a continuous, open-ended refusal to take on defence legally aided work from 5 September 2022.

2,273 members of the Criminal Bar Association voted. The turnout exceeded that on the second ballot in June (2,055) and was significantly higher than that witnessed in the first ballot in March (1,908). Given that many members had been away during this month, the increased level of participation in this latest ballot spoke volumes about the strength of feeling amongst barristers across all six Circuits. The result of the ballot was as follows:

- Option 1 (Cessation of all action): 207 votes (9.11%)
- Option 2A (Continuation of current action): 258 votes (11.35%)
- Option 2B (Escalation of action): 1,808 votes (79.54%)

Accordingly, what had been one week on, and one week off, became permanent action from the 5 September 2022.

== Conclusion ==
In October 2022, barristers voted to end the strike following a deal with then-Secretary of State for Justice, Brandon Lewis. Less than a month later, Dominic Raab returned to replace Lewis in the cabinet reshuffle following Liz Truss's resignation. The CBA issued a statement 31 October 2022 reassuring barristers that the new government would honor the original deal, which as of the statement "now is government policy".

== Reactions ==
CBA chair Jo Sidhu QC and vice-chair Kirsty Brimelow QC stated, "Through our labour and our goodwill, we have sustained a chronically underfunded criminal justice system on behalf of the public while suffering substantial reductions in our real incomes and exhausted by the hugely increased demands placed upon us... We have already lost too many of our colleagues who can no longer afford to maintain their commitment to criminal work". Justice secretary Dominic Raab described the action as an “unnecessary and irresponsible strike" whose effect would be to "cause delays for victims and the wider public". According to the Secret Barrister, "Our demands are not unreasonable. We are asking simply for reasonable pay for the work we do." Law Society president I. Stephanie Boyce said that "The government response sends a clear message that the Ministry of Justice is simply not serious about tackling that crisis". Former Conservative MP Anna Soubry expressed support for the strike. The Legal Aid Agency advertised for solicitor higher court advocates, who have rights of audience in the Crown Court, to replace barristers who were refraining from undertaking returns, but some solicitors publicly stated that they refused the offer and the agency did not disclose how many solicitors were doing returns.

Following the end of the strike in October, Mark Fenhalls KC, chair of the Bar Council was pleased the Bar barristers had accepted the offer: "The disruption of the work of the criminal courts has caused huge stress to all those who work in the justice system, and to the public which depends upon this vital public service". The Law Society called for increased benefits also for solicitors, who will see an increase of only 9% in pay; the deal won by barristers will see their pay increase by 15%. Victim Support welcomed the end of the strike and outlined long-term nature of the problem. Its chief executive Diana Fawcett stated that "when it comes to the huge backlogs in our courts, these strikes, and the delay caused by the pandemic are only part of the picture... Long court delays have been an issue for nearly a decade, and are agonising for victims".
