= Trade Boards Act =

Trade Boards Act may refer to:

- Trade Boards Act 1909
- Trade Boards Act 1918
