= Scottbridge Construction Ltd v Wright =

- Court: Court of Session
- Citations: [2002] ScotCS 285, [2003] IRLR 21

Keywords
- Minimum wage, worker

Scottbridge Construction Ltd v Wright [2002] ScotCS 285 is a UK labour law case regarding the National Minimum Wage Act 1998.

== Facts ==
Mr Wright was a night watchman and was required to work seven nights a week from 5pm to 7am at the employer's office in Glasgow. He got £210 a week. He was permitted to sleep during his shifts. He had been given a mattress. He could have done so for all but four hours. If he had been paid a minimum wage for all the time on duty he would have had an extra £142.80 a week and a total of £34272.20 by the time of his claim.

The Tribunal held that the four hours when Mr Wright was required to be awake was the relevant time, and so he should be paid for the work when he was on call. The EAT reversed the Tribunal and the case was appealed again.

== Judgment ==
Lord President Cullen held that NMWR 1999 regulation 15(1) did not apply to Mr Wright, and he should be paid for all the time spent at work, even if asleep. The contract was paid according to a reference by time work. It was held that r 15(1) only applied to time on call, and not the present case.

== See also ==
- UK labour law
