= France v James Coombes & Co =

- Court: House of Lords
- Citation: [1929] AC 496

Case history
- Prior action: [1928] 2 KB 81

Keywords
- Trade Boards, minimum wage

France v James Coombes & Co [1929] AC 496 is an old UK labour law case, concerning the definition of ‘employee’ for the purpose of section 8 of the Trade Boards Act 1909 and the Trade Boards Act 1918.

== Facts ==
The Minister of Labour under the Trade Boards Act 1909 and the Trade Boards Act 1918 made an order applicable to boot and shop repairing called the Trade Boards (Boot and Shoe Repairing) Order 1919. This established a trade board to fix minimum rates of wages for managers and other classes of workers in the trade. It did so and the Minister of Labour confirmed them by an order on 8 August 1922. Mr France claimed the minimum wage applied to him from his employer, James Coombes & Co. He repaired boots, and so was physically working, for less than half the time he was in the shop. The employer contended that taking this into account he was receiving the minimum wage.

MacKinnon J at the King's Bench and Scrutton LJ, Sankey LJ, and Romer J in the Court of Appeal held that when the manager was not actually working, there was no entitlement to be paid.

== Judgment ==
The House of Lords, by a majority, held that Mr France was not to be considered employed "all the time during which he was present" at the shop under TBA 1918 s 8, because in that time he was "so present for some purpose unconnected with his work and other than that of waiting for work to be given to him to perform."

Lord Blanesburgh dissented, his judgment read by Lord Atkin. He would have allowed the appeal.

My Lords, seeing that the presumed necessity for fixing any minimum wage rate at all in any particular trade is due to the apprehension on the part of the Minister that in its absence workmen in that trade may have imposed upon them wages which they ought not to be asked to accept, but which, either as a result of competition in the labour market or deficient bargaining power, they are not in a position to refuse, this answer of Mr. Bevan's may not, I think, be accepted as correct or adequate without very full consideration. If it be well founded it at once removes out of the way every obstacle to the wholesale evasion of these protective Acts. I proceed therefore to test its correctness by a consideration of the relevant provisions of the Acts and of the Boot and Shoe Repairing Trade Order with which your Lordships are now immediately concerned. My Lords, in common with, I think, many similar enactments, these Acts do not require that any Order made under them shall bind the employer to find for his workers in general, if the worker is paid by the piece, work of any prescribed amount, or if he is paid on a time basis, work for any prescribed time. What is required of the employer is that the worker shall receive at least the minimum rate of remuneration for the work actually done, or for the time spent in the statutory employment. And this is in terms so provided for by s. VIII. of Part I. of Sch. I. of this Order.

== See also ==
- UK labour law
