= Leisure Employment Services Ltd v HM Revenue & Customs =

Leisure Employment Services Ltd v HMRC
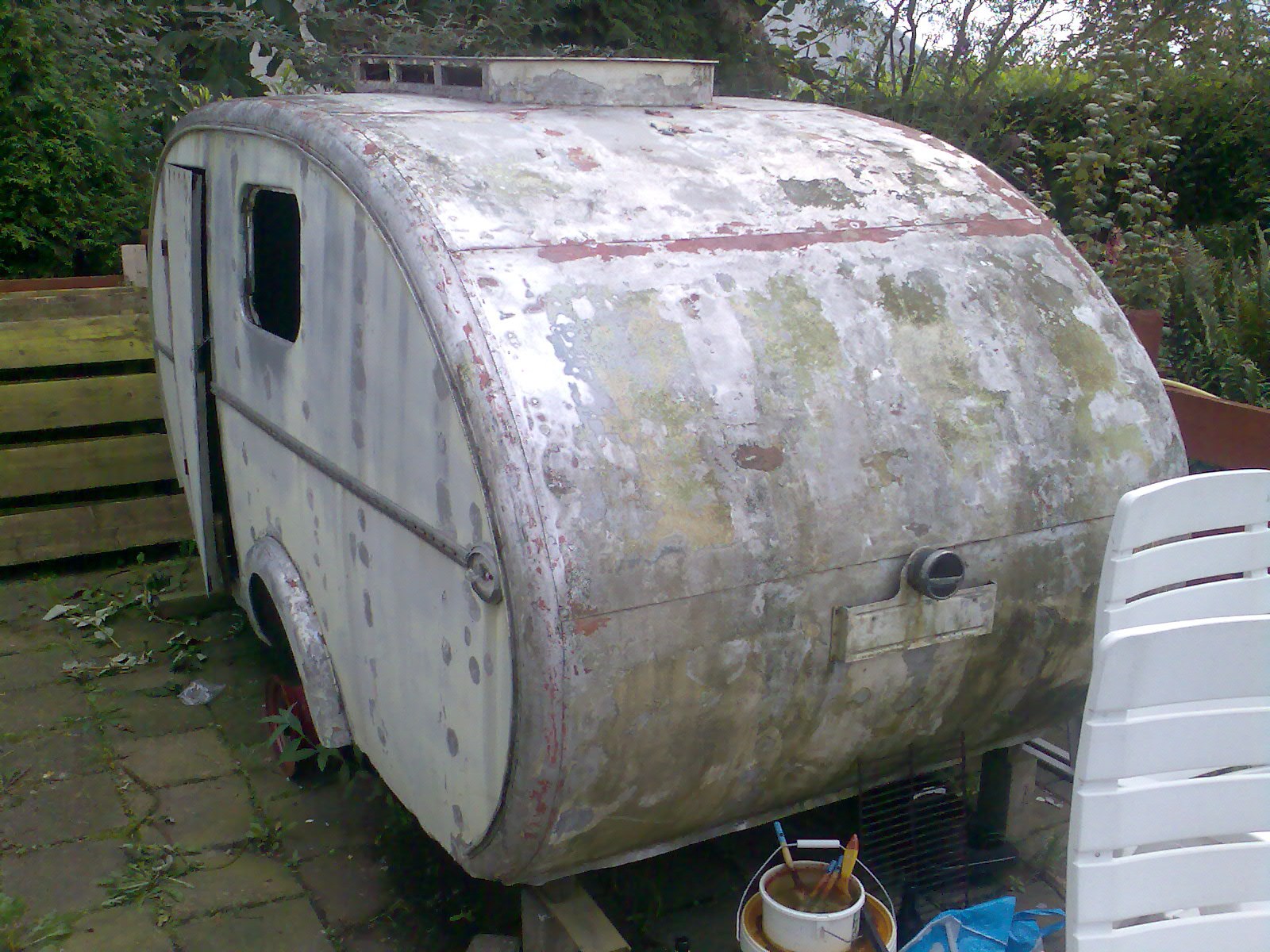
- Court: Court of Appeal
- Citations: [2007] EWCA Civ 92, [2007] ICR 1056

Court membership
- Judges sitting: Buxton LJ, Smith LJ and Wilson LJ

Keywords
- Minimum wage, deductions

Leisure Employment Services Ltd v HM Revenue & Customs [2007] EWCA Civ 92 is a UK labour law case on the interpretation of the National Minimum Wage Act 1998. It concerns the extent to which an employer may make deductions from a worker's basic wage entitlement for the purpose of accommodation costs. The effect is that deductions for heat and light bills may not go beyond the maximum deduction rate for accommodation cost.

== Facts ==
Leisure Employment Services Ltd was a wholly owned subsidiary company of Bourne Leisure Ltd. It employed a number of holiday workers on caravan sites around England. These workers were paid the minimum wage. They were also given accommodation in the company's caravans, for which the maximum level of deductions from their wages were made (the maximum amount is stated under the r 36 of the National Minimum Wage Regulations). The employer also tried to deduct £6 a fortnight for heat and light bills. HM Revenue and Customs (which enforces the National Minimum Wage Act) issued an enforcement notice. It said this led the employer to breach their obligations under the Act. Leisure Employment Services Ltd. appealed to the Employment Tribunal, which gave judgment in their favour. But the Employment Appeal Tribunal overturned the judgment. The Court of Appeal eventually dismissed the employer's appeal.

== Judgment ==
The majority judgment held that under r 31(1)(i) any deduction 'in respect of the provision of living accommodation' provided by the employer included heat and light bills. This is because the worker had no choice over whether to take heat and light to live in the caravans. It was a necessary part of their staying there. Therefore, the costs of heat and light could not be deducted by the employer in addition to the deductions for the accommodation itself.

== See also ==
- UK labour law
