= History of the welfare state in the United Kingdom =

The History of the welfare state in the United Kingdom covers the growth of welfare programmes and programmes for the poor since the initial formation of the UK in 1707, with emphasis on the establishment of a welfare state in the 20th century. For recent trends see Welfare state in the United Kingdom.

== Background ==
=== Before 1707 ===
According to historian Ian Keil, the poor laws evolved from a church-based system to an increasingly centralized state system over time, with a focus on workhouses and restricting relief in the 19th century. In medieval times, canon law required parishes to use one-third of tithe income to support the poor. This system broke down over time as tithe revenues were diverted elsewhere. Parliament intervened with the Statute of Cambridge 1388 that penalized unauthorized departures, legitimized begging and required parishes to support their own poor. The "Old Poor Law" of 1601 created a more coherent system, requiring each parish to be responsible for its own poor, funded by collecting rates from property owners. It distinguished the deserving and undeserving poor. The Act of Settlement 1662 restricted poor relief to long-term residents or those born in a parish.

=== 18th Century ===
In the 18th century, some parishes formed unions to build workhouses for the poor who were able to work.

The Poor Law Amendment Act 1834 established a stricter workhouse system and created unions of parishes administered by boards of guardians. It was designed make the alternative to paid labor an unpleasant experience, with a goal of punishing shirkers and minimizing expenditures. The 1834 act was imposed by the local landed gentry and was widely disliked by the poor. The object of the workhouses, one official stated, "is to establish therein a discipline so severe and repulsive as to make them a terror to the poor and prevent them from entering." Nevertheless it remained the basic system, with some amendments, until 1929.

Alongside the Poor Law, the nineteenth century also saw proposals for new forms of social insurance. In 1868, the Rev. John Young Stratton proposed a system of insurance for wage-paid workers administered through the Post Office. Historians Philip Corrigan and Derek Sayer identify Stratton's scheme as part of contemporary discussion of a "State Friendly Society".

==== Public education ====
Free public education is a major element of the welfare state, and emerged finally in 1902. In 1800 there was far from agreement that universal education was beneficial. The elites were very well educated. They started with home tutoring, followed by very expensive "public schools" (like Eton College), and capped off at Oxford and Cambridge universities. Before industrialization took hold around 1800, most parents were farm workers with no education, and they saw little need to pay money to educate their children. As the cities grew explosively there was a growing need for literate workers. However Some elites felt that any schooling for the working classes as unnecessary or even dangerous. However, by the 1830s, that attitude faded away and the risks of educating the working classes were generally seen as outweighed by the risks of leaving them ignorant or allowing their education to be out of the control of the authorities. As political reforms enlarged the electorate it became more urgent to educate the new electorate. Educational reformer James Kay-Shuttleworth said in 1838 that the state was responsible for "rearing... children in religion and industry, and of imparting such an amount of secular education as may fit them to discharge the duties of their station."

==== "Voluntary schools" operated by churches ====
For England and Wales, Parliament began annual funding to schools operated by churches in the mid 1830s, and steadily increased the amounts and the oversight. The main religious denominations set up full-time local elementary schools, with modest tuition, for their own children. They taught reading, writing, arithmetic, and religion up to grade 8, as well as how to follow schedules, plan ahead, and behave in orderly fashion. In rural England the Anglicans of the established Church of England were dominant. In towns there were schools operated by the "Dissenting" or "Nonconformist" Methodists, Congregationalists, Presbyterians and Baptists. These all were called "Voluntary Schools" and before the 1830s the local and national government provided no aid. Nonconformists set up the "British and Foreign School Society" in 1808 to help with funding and textbooks, while the Church of England in 1811 set up a similar "National Society for Promoting Religious Education" to help its larger network of National schools. With the arrival of over a million Irish Catholics after 1845, the larger cities soon had Catholic elementary schools. The quality of provision varied significantly, and the average length of attendance was only three years.

Parliament took interest and in 1839 began making annual subsidies. The Dissenters complained as most of the money went to the Anglican schools. In Manchester, a booming industrial center with 355,000 people in 1870, rivalry among the Voluntary Schools was fierce. Of the 164 schools receiving government subsidies in 1869, 37% were Church of England, 16% were Dissenting, 11% were Catholic, and 37% were nondenominational.

Scotland had a separate educational system, one with a long tradition of state-funded education dating back to the 17th century. The system which made school provision the responsibility of parishes of the established Presbyterian Church. They generally led to better outcomes than elsewhere in Great Britain but struggled to cope with the pressures of industrialisation and standards began to slip. A similar kind of grant system to voluntary schools was used in Scotland as in England. The Education (Scotland) Act 1872 introduced many of the same kinds of reforms as were taking place in England and Wales during the later 19th century. Education was made compulsory for five to thirteen-year-olds, the structure of the system was simplified, and many new schools were built. The 1870 Elementary Education Act was intended to establish universal access to state-funded schools and the state began to run schools directly for the first time through a system of local governance. Education became compulsory for five- to ten-year-olds in 1880 and fees abolished in 1891. Compulsory education was expanded to deaf children, blind children and all children up to the age of twelve in the 1890s.

==== Churches also run Sunday Schools ====
Sunday schools were free programs, one day a week, for all the children in a parish, including those attending a regular school on week days. Inexperienced parents volunteered to do the teaching. They taught reading and hymns. The movement began in the 1780s and rapidly spread across Britain. In 1824 some 400,000 Anglican children attended 3000 Sunday schools sponsored by the National Society. By the late 19th century they reached as many as 75% of all children. By the 1850s about 300,000 adults were teaching in all the Sunday schools, as well as attending their own training programs, arranging guest speakers and planning treats such as excursions by train for the children. The movement peaked in the 1880s. After that growth of public schools lessened the educational role of Sunday schools.

=== Liberal reforms 1908–1914 ===
In 1906 the Liberal Party under Henry Campbell-Bannerman rallied Dissenting Protestants against the education bill (which helped the schools of the established Church of England), and rallied around the traditional platform of free trade. The result was a massive landslide and the greatest electoral victory in Liberal Party history.

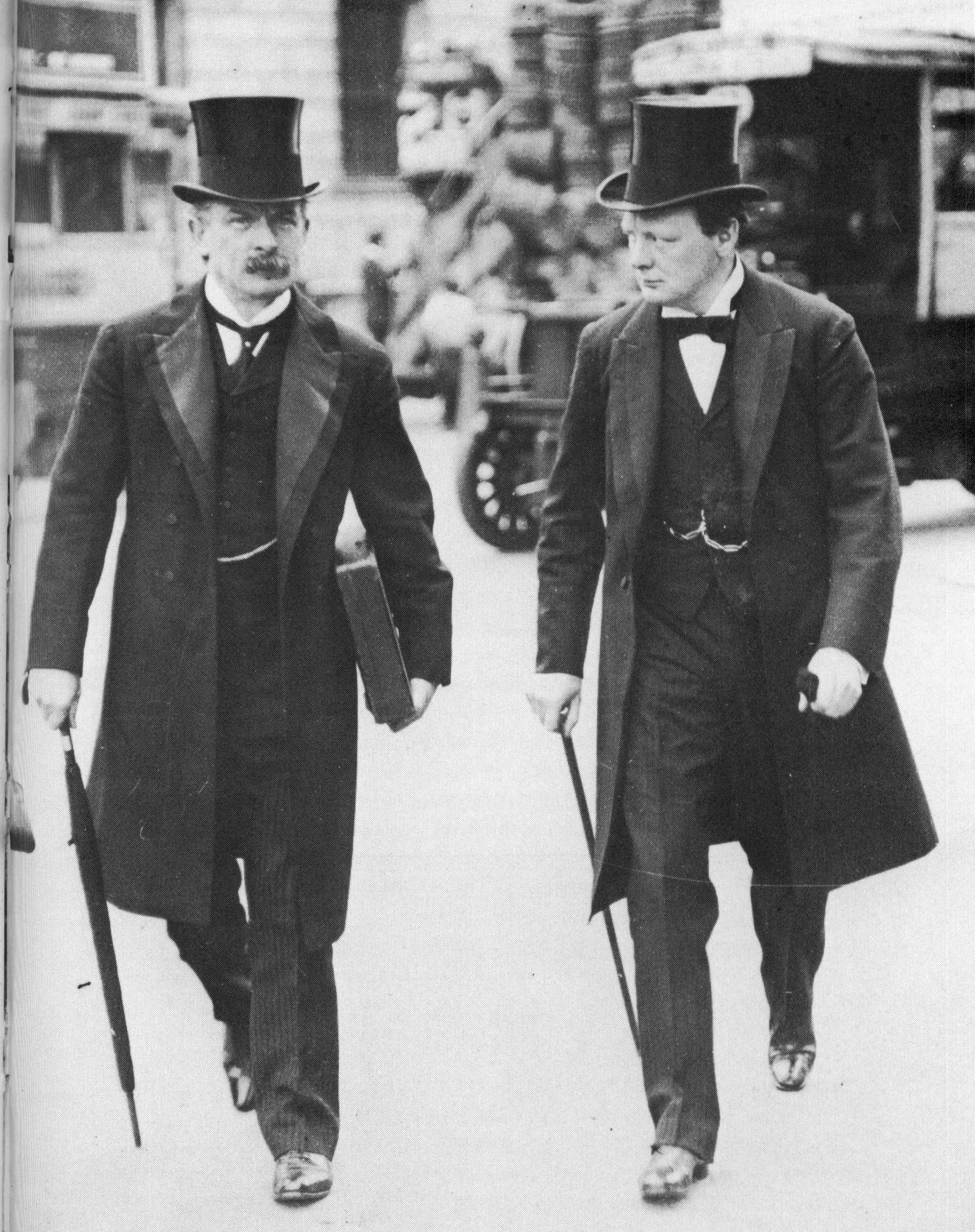
David Lloyd George (left) and Winston Churchill in 1907

After a confused performance in 1906–1907 with few results, H. H. Asquith became prime minister in 1908 and shifted emphasis to new reform issues promoted by David Lloyd George as Chancellor of the Exchequer and Winston Churchill at the Board of Trade and as Home Secretary. Reformers focused on the "People's Budget" of 1909 that proposed to fund expanded social welfare programmes with new taxes on land and high incomes. It was blocked by the Conservative-dominated House of Lords, and led to a dramatic confrontation and two more elections in 1910. The Liberals prevailed and passed their main reforms.

Before 1906 the Liberals favored "freedom from", with minimal government regulation and taxes, as preached by William E. Gladstone. That now changed as half of the Liberal MPs elected in 1906 were supportive of the "new liberalism". It meant "freedom from" unhappy social and economic constraints. It advocated government action to improve people's lives.

Liberals in 1906–1911 passed major legislation designed to reform politics and society, such as the regulation of working hours, National Insurance and the beginnings of the welfare state, as well as curtailing the power of the House of Lords. Women's suffrage was not on the Liberal agenda. There were numerous major reforms helping labour, typified by the Trade Boards Act 1909 that set minimum wages in certain trades with the history of "sweated" or "sweatshop" rates of especially low wages, because of surplus of available workers, the presence of women workers, or the lack of skills.

At first it applied to four industries: chain-making, ready-made tailoring, paper-box making, and the machine-made lace and finishing trade. It was later expanded to coal mining and then to other industries with preponderance of unskilled manual labour by the Trade Boards Act 1918. Under the leadership of Lloyd George Liberals extended minimum wages to farm workers.

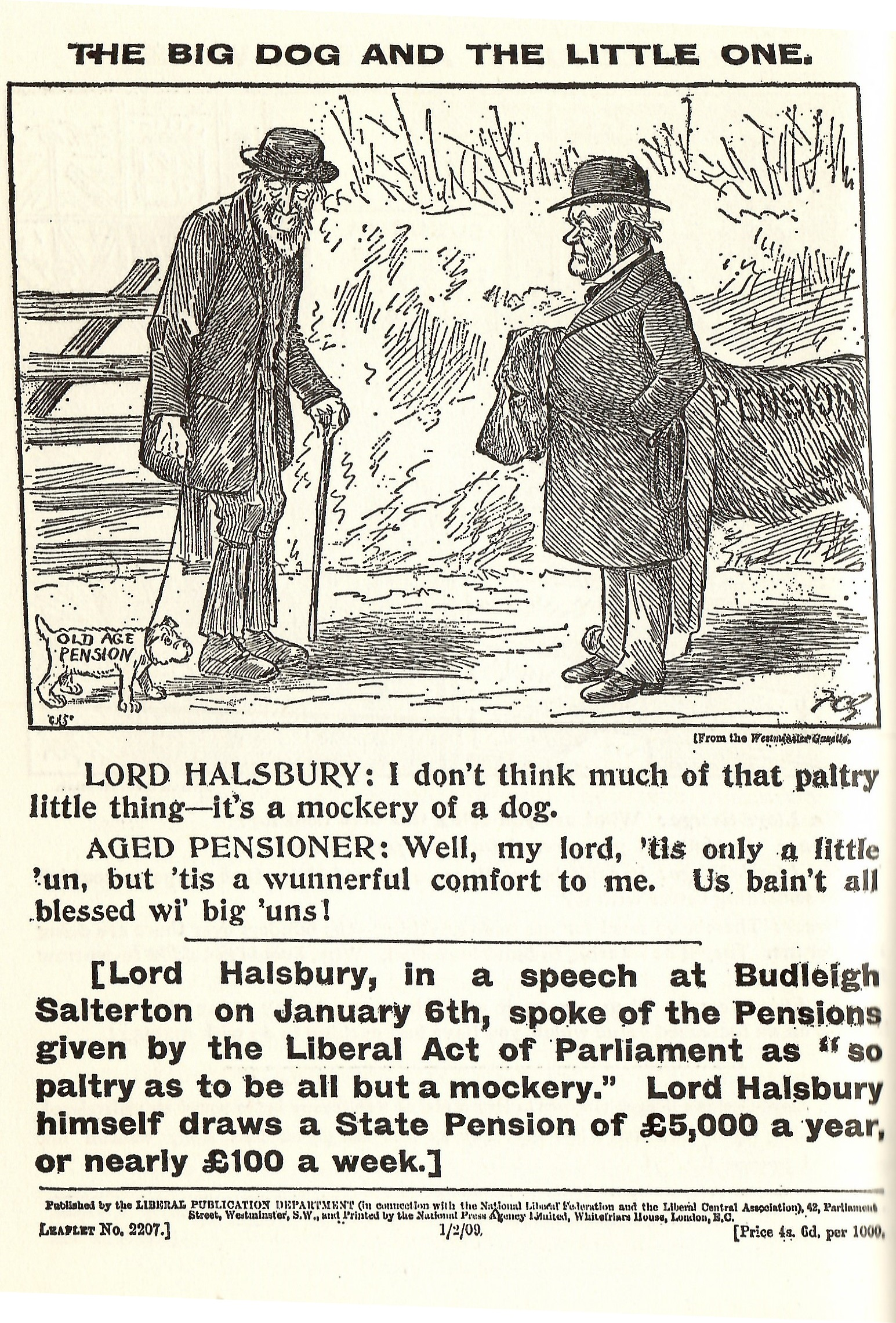
UK Liberal Party poster in 1909 defends new old age pension shown as a little dog while the rich aristocratic landlord has a huge government pension (shown as a very large dog).

==== Pension law ====
The "Old Age Pension" was introduced in 1909 in the United Kingdom (which included all of Ireland at that time). Following the passage of the Old Age Pensions Act 1908 a pension of 5/- per week (£0.25, equivalent, using the Consumer Price Index, to £26 in present-day terms), or 7/6 per week (£0.38, equivalent to £39/week today) for a married couple, was payable to persons with an income below £21 per annum (equivalent to £2200 today), The qualifying age was 70, and the pensions were subject to a means test.

It provided 5 shillings (£0.25) a week for those over age 70 whose annual means did not exceed £31 10s. (£31.50). It coincided with the Royal Commission on the Poor Laws and Relief of Distress 1905–1909 and was the first step in the Liberal welfare reforms towards the completion of a system of social security, with unemployment and health insurance through the National Insurance Act 1911.

This almost removed old people from the Poor law in England. In 1906 168,096 people over 70 in England and Wales were on outdoor relief. In 1913 only 8,563.

==== Minimum wage ====
The Trade Boards Act 1909 provided for the creation of boards which could set minimum wage criteria that were legally enforceable. Churchill was the chief sponsor; his goal was to help alleviate poverty. The main provision was to set minimum wages in certain trades with historically low wages and low skills. At first it applied to four industries: chain-making, ready-made tailoring, paper-box making, machine-made lace making, and finishing trades. They employed 140,000 women and 60,000 men. It was expanded in 1912 to mining and then to other industries with a preponderance of unskilled manual labour. It was further expanded and updated in the Trade Boards Act 1918.

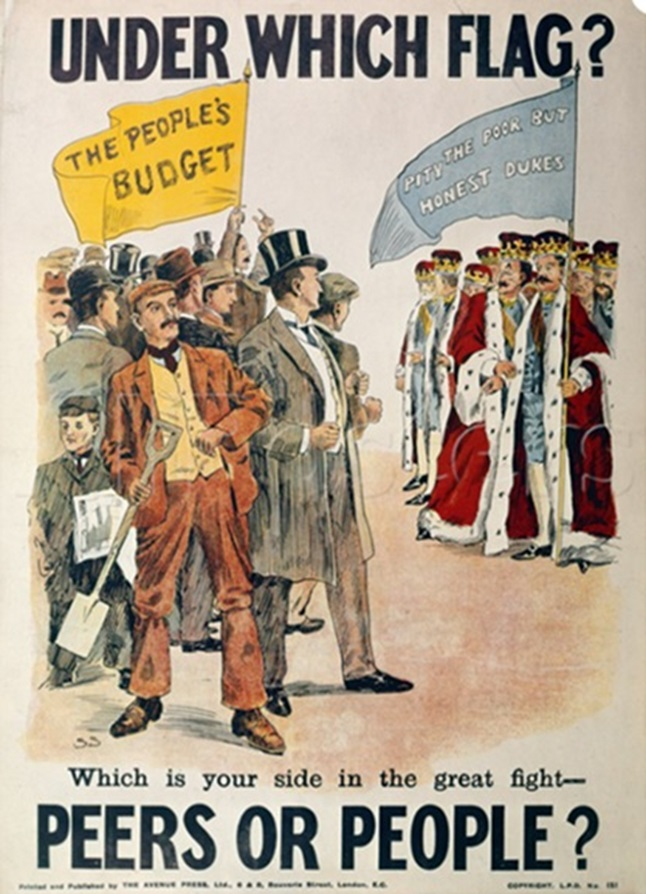
Election poster from "Labour Party and Democratic League" (a faction of the Labour Party)

==== Battle over People's Budget ====
The 1909/1910 People's budget was a proposal of the Liberal government designed to pay for the pension and insurance plans by raising taxes on the rich, including income taxes and taxes on land. The wealth of the aristocracy and gentry was based on farm land they owned and leased to millions of tenants. The budget passed the House of Commons in 1909 but was blocked by the House of Lords for a year. After a fierce battle it became law in April 1910.

The budget was drafted by Lloyd George acting as Chancellor of the Exchequer, and enthusiastically supported by Churchill. The budget was revolutionary because it was the first budget in British history with the expressed intent of redistributing wealth more equally among the entire population. It was a key issue in the January 1910 United Kingdom general election as well as the December 1910 United Kingdom general election. The Liberals won both elections narrowly and passed the budget and also the Parliament Act 1911 which weakened the ability of the House of Lords to block legislation passed by the House of Commons.

=== Labour reforms 1945–1950 ===
==== Wartime proposals ====
Postwar planning was a highpriority, and the leader was sociologist William Beveridge. In 1942 he called for all-out war against what he identified as the five giants; idleness, ignorance, disease, squalor and want.

==== National Health Service Act ====
The National Health Service Act 1946 (9 & 10 Geo. 6. c. 81) came into effect on 5 July 1948 and created the National Health Service in England and Wales thus being the first implementation of the Beveridge Model. Though the title 'National Health Service' implies a single health service for the United Kingdom, in reality one NHS was created for England and Wales accountable to the Secretary of State for Health, with a separate NHS created for Scotland accountable to the Secretary of State for Scotland by the passage of the National Health Service (Scotland) Act 1947. Similar health services in Northern Ireland were created by the Northern Ireland Parliament through the Health Services Act (Northern Ireland) 1948.

The whole Act was replaced by the National Health Service Act 1977, which itself is now superseded by the National Health Service Act 2006 and the Health and Social Care Act 2012.

==== National Insurance Act and National Assistance Act ====
The National Insurance Act 1946 completed universal coverage of social security. The National Assistance Act 1948 formally abolished the poor law, and gave a minimum income to those not paying National Insurance.

== Historical statistics ==
=== Benefit rates as a percentage of industrial earnings ===
Benefit rates as a per cent of industrial earnings of male manual workers aged 21 and over (1948–71)
Year (month)	Single pension	Supplementary Benefit for single person	Family Allowance for four children
1948 (October)	18.9	17.5	10.9
1961 (April)	19.1	17.8	9.3
1962 (April)	18.4	17.1	8.9
1963 (May)	20.8	19.5	8.6
1964 (April)	19.2	18.1	8.0
1964 (October)	18.7	17.6	7.7
1965 (April)	21.2	20.1	7.4
1965 (October)	20.4	19.4	7.1
1966 (April)	19.8	18.8	6.9
1966 (October)	19.7	20.0	6.9
1967 (April)	19.4	19.7	6.8
1967 (October)	21.0	20.1	7.7
1968 (April)	20.2	19.3	11.9
1968 (October)	19.6	19.8	12.6
1969 (April)	18.8	19.3	12.1
1969 (November)	20.0	19.2	11.7
1970 (April)	19.0	18.3	11.3
1970 (November)	17.6	18.3	10.2
1971 (March) (est.)	17.3	18.0	10.0

Note on source, as quoted in the text: "based on statistics of weekly earnings, Employment and Productivity Gazette."

=== Changes in National Assistance/Supplementary Benefit ===
Changes in National Assistance/Supplementary Benefit scale (1963–1969) (a)
Date of change	Real value single pensioner	Real value married man with three children (b)	Real take home pay for average worker
May 1963	100	100	100
March 1965	111	112	106
November 1966	117	110	106
October 1967	122	115	108
November 1969	122	115	110

Notes

- (a) As quoted in the text: "the scale is calculated using the average discretionary addition (adjusted to spread winter fuel costs throughout the year) for retirement pensioners. It does not include any allowance for rent. The price index used for the single pensioner is that in the Employment and Productivity Gazette."
- (b) As quoted in the text: "it is assumed that the children are aged four, six, and eleven."

=== Increases in National Insurance benefits ===
Increases in National Insurance benefits (1963–69):
Date of increase	Real take home pay for average worker (a)	Real value of single pension (b)	Real value of unemployment benefit (man with wife and three children) (c)
March/May 1963	100	100	100
January/March 1965	106	111	110
October 1967	108	114	113
November 1969	110	114	116

Notes

- (a) As quoted by text: "Based on average earnings for adult male manual workers in manufacturing, allowing for income tax and national insurance contributions."
- (b) As quoted by text: "Calculated on the special price index for single pensioner households published by the Employment and Productivity Gazette adjusted for housing expenditure using the housing component of the retail price index. Since a disproportionate number of pensioners have controlled tenancies, this may overstate the increase in prices."
- (c) This column is deflated by use of the Retail Price Index

=== Social security benefits as a percentage of average earnings ===
Social security benefits as a percentage of average earnings for last increases of various governments, 1951–79
Government	Sickness/unemployment benefit a	a plus earnings related supplement	Retirement pensions c	Supplementary allowance/benefits d	Family allowance/child benefit e
Labour (1951)	25.7	25.7	30.4	30.4	8.0
Conservative (1963)	33.8	33.8	33.0	31.6	5.3
Labour (1969)	32.4	52.3	32.4	31.4	3.8
Conservative (1973)	29.1	46.2	30.5	28.5	3.0
Labour (1978)	30.5	44.4	37.4	30.2	3.7

- a, b Man plus dependent wife.
- c Man plus dependent wife on his insurance.
- d Married couple.
- e For one child.

=== Social policy benefits and earnings under the Labour Government 1964–69 ===
Social policy benefits and earnings under Labour 1963–69:
Year	Unemployment, sickness, and retirement benefits (single)	Retirement pension (married)	National assistance/supplementary benefit (married couple)	Adult male manual workers (weekly earnings)	Adult male administrative, technical, and clerical employees (weekly earnings)
1963	100	100	100	100	100
1969	148	149	150	154	148

=== Supplementary benefits rates as a proportion of income ===
Supplementary benefit rates as a proportion of gross and net income at average earnings, married couple:
Year	End of year (a)	
	As % of gross average earnings	
	Ordinary rate	Long term rate
1973	28.5	31.4
1974	28.1	33.6
1975	29.8	36.2
1976	30.8	37.1
1977	32.3	38.9
1978	30.6	37.8
	As % of net income (b) at average earnings	
	Ordinary rate	Long term rate
1973	37.9	41.8
1974	38.8	46.5
1975	42.4	51.5
1976	43.9	52.9
1977	44.1	53.1
1978	41.6	51.4

Supplementary benefit: long term scale rate as proportion of ordinary rate (%)
Date of introduction	Single	Married couple
1973	14.0	10.3
1974	23.8	19.8
1975 (April)	25.0	20.4
1975 (November)	25.7	21.4
1976	23.6	20.3
1977	23.4	20.4
1978	28.0	23.5

=== Households dependent on Supplementary Benefit ===
Numbers in households dependent on supplementary benefit or with estimated incomes below SB level, 1974 and 1976 (thousands)
Year	Pensioners		Under pensionable age family head or single parent			
Year		(as % of total)	Unemployed	Normally in full-time work	Sick or disabled	Others
1974	2,680	(52%)	450	360	480	1,170
1976	2,800	(44%)	1,080	890	280	1,300

=== Changes in real terms in social security benefits ===
Changes in real terms in social security benefits, 1964–79 (in 1981 prices, 1951= 100):
Year	Supplementary benefits (a)	Sickness/unemployment benefit (b)	Retirement pensions (c)	Family allowance/child benefit (d)
1964	146	176	149	85
1965	166	199	168	85
1966	165	199	168	82
1967	173	318	173	80
1968	173	318	173	77
1969	172	329	172	72
1970	173	329	172	69
1971	178	354	177	80
1972	187	356	183	75
1973	186	342	191	68
1974	191	345	216	78
1975	187	327	215	69
1976	189	323	219	72
1977	190	326	221	69
1978	189	321	228	82
1979	190	308	232	102

Notes

- (a) Refers to married couple.
- (b) Refers to man plus dependent wife.
- (c) Refers to man plus wife on his insurance. After 1971 refers to recipients under 80 years old.
- (d) Includes family allowance and tax allowance combined for second child up to 1977, when these were unified into the child benefit.

=== Percentage change in social security benefits, prices and earnings ===
Percentage change in social security benefits, prices, and earnings since previous updating (1974–1978):
Date	Unemployment and sickness benefit (a)	Retirement pension (b)	Prices (c)	Average earnings (d)
July 1974	17.0	29.0	13.5	12.9
April 1975	14.0	16.0	17.7	17.4
November 1975	13.3	14.7	11.7	10.7
November 1976	16.2	15.0	15.0	12.8
November 1977	14.0	14.4	13.0	9.6
November 1978	7.1	11.4	8.1	14.6
Total increase October 1973 – 1978	114.3	151.6	109.6	107.9

- (a) Single person.
- (b) Single pensioner under age 80.
- (c) General index of retail prices.
- (d) Average gross weekly earnings of full-time adult male manual workers. For November 1978, October 1977 to October 1978 increase used.

=== Unemployment and sickness benefits as a percentage of income ===
Unemployment or sickness benefits as percentage of net income (a) at average earnings (b):
Year	Single person		Married couple		Married couple with two children	
Year	Excl. ERS	Inc. ERS (c)	Excl. ERS	Inc. ERS (c)	Excl. ERS	Inc. ERS (c)
1965	27.0	27.0	41.2	41.2	49.3	49.3
1970	25.0	53.3	38.4	65.2	48.3	72.7
1973	24.8	48.4	38.7	61.5	49.5	70.6
1974	25.6	48.6	39.5	61.6	50.2	70.3
1975	24.5	45.9	38.0	58.4	48.3	67.0
1976	24.9	46.7	38.3	59.1	48.4	67.3
1977	25.8	47.9	39.1	59.9	49.7	68.8
1978	25.4	45.1	38.8	57.4	49.6	66.9

- (a) After allowing for income tax and national insurance contributions.
- (b) Average earnings of adult male manual workers.
- (c) Earnings Related Supplement calculated using average earnings in October of the relevant tax year.

=== The real value of social security benefits, 1948–75 ===
Value of social security benefits in £1981 s
Date	Unemployment benefit	Retirement pension	Supplementary benefit	Child support: one child	Child support: three children
1948, July	19.64	19.64	17.93	4.87	17.60
1961, April	26.88	26.88	25.31	4.36	16.62
1971, September	34.96	34.96	33.39	4.27	15.36
1975, November	36.47	42.96	35.10	3.67	13.81

== See also ==
- English Poor Laws
- History of labour law in the United Kingdom
- History of poverty in the United Kingdom
- Liberal welfare reforms
- Timeline of pensions in the United Kingdom
- Universal Credit
- Welfare state in the United Kingdom
