= History of poverty in the United Kingdom =

The history of poverty in the United Kingdom since its initial formation in 1707 has been shaped by the complex forces of social, economic, and political change. Through the centuries, poverty has remained an entrenched challenge, persisting despite the continuous evolution of welfare systems and reform efforts.

== Medieval and Early Modern Period ==
Historical study of poverty in the medieval period (before 1600) relies on narrative sources, such as chronicles and manorial records, to track local hardship conditions. Early accounts emphasized episodic crises—famines, plague, and warfare—which greatly influenced perceptions of poverty and the vulnerability of peasants and townsfolk. The social and economic difficulties before and after the Black Death (c. 1348–1351) are especially well-documented, with chroniclers noting dramatic price fluctuations, shortages, and population vulnerability. During the medieval period, poverty was primarily interpreted a religious and moral framework. Catholicism emphasized sacrifice, and bestowed prestige on religious monks and friars who took vows of poverty. Much poverty was linked to feudal obligations, leading to a widespread existence defined by subsistence living. The Church offered charity through its monasteries.

A significant shift occurred with the Dissolution of the monasteries (1536–1541) under King Henry VIII. This act eliminated a major source of organized relief, resulting in a surge of visible poverty and vagrancy. In response to this crisis, the Tudor state began legislating to both control and assist the poor. This effort culminated in the pivotal Elizabethan Poor Relief Act 1601, which fundamentally changed social welfare. The Act emphasized local responsibility for the destitute. It introduced a crucial distinction between the "deserving" (those unable to work) and the "undeserving" (sturdy beggars and vagrants). As a result the burden of care was handled by parishes, funded by local property taxes known as poor rates. By the 18th century, the parish relief system was breaking down. Parishes that provided more aid received more vagrants and they did not want them. Meanwhile, useful farm workers were leaving for the rapidly growing industrial cities.

== Industrial Revolution and 19th Century ==
The Industrial Revolution (from the late 18th to the early 19th century) fundamentally altered the British economy, yet it simultaneously intensified poverty. This era was characterized by rapid urbanization, which resulted in the development of overcrowded slums, unsanitary living conditions, and precarious employment. Factory and agricultural workers typically earned modest wages, and the practice of child labor became pervasive. There has been a lively debate among scholars as to whether the industrial workers during the period of 1750 to 1850 saw their real wages rise or fall.

The Poor Law Amendment Act 1834 fundamentally changed the system of relief, focusing on cost reduction and actively discouraging dependence on public aid. This was achieved by establishing the workhouse system, where conditions were intentionally made harsh in order to deter their use. Workhouses were abolished in the early 20th century.

Debate over poverty and poor relief also included proposals for insurance schemes. In 1868, the clergyman John Young Stratton proposed a system of insurance for wage-paid workers administered through the Post Office, which historians Philip Corrigan and Derek Sayer place within contemporary discussion of a “State Friendly Society”.

Throughout the 19th century, philanthropic initiatives and social reform movements began to target the reduction of poverty. Growing public concern over urban deprivation led to campaigns focused on public health through urban sanitation and clean water, housing reform, and free schooling. Under Whig leadership Parliament began to intervene. The Factory Acts, which slowly improved labor conditions, and largely ended child labour.

== 1900 to 1939 ==
The early 1900s exposed deep flaws in the Poor Law system. Groundbreaking social research by Charles Booth in London and Seebohm Rowntree in York demonstrated that poverty affected many working families, undermining the prevailing notion that destitution stemmed purely from personal shortcomings.

Between 1906 and 1914, the Liberal government enacted transformative welfare reforms. They ranged widely to include action regarding workers, schools, children, elderly, and farmers. These included establishing old-age pensions, creating labour exchanges to help the unemployed find work, and introducing national insurance schemes covering sickness and unemployment. These initiatives marked the first significant movement toward a modern welfare state.

The depression of the 1930s brought severe economic hardship especially in the older industrial areas. Local relief authorities implemented the "Means Test" to determine eligibility for assistance. This intrusive assessment of household resources became deeply unpopular among struggling families and symbolized the harsh face of state welfare. Massive protests led to the abolition of the test in 1941, at a time when unemployment was disappearing due to wartime prosperity and the movement of most young men into service.

== 1940s ==
World War II (1939–1945) dramatically expanded government involvement in citizens' lives. Wartime measures including rationing systems, mass evacuation programs, and employment regulations helped mitigate certain forms of deprivation. Beyond immediate relief, the war created momentum for substantial social reform.

The Beveridge Report is a government report, published in November 1942, decisive in the founding of the welfare state in the United Kingdom. It was drafted by the Liberal economist William Beveridge and proposed widespread reforms to the system of social welfare to address what it identified as "five giants on the road of reconstruction": Want, Disease, Ignorance, Squalor and Idleness. Published in the midst of World War II, the report promised rewards for everyone's sacrifices. Overwhelmingly popular with the public, it formed the basis for the post-war reforms by the Labour Party of Clement Attlee known as the "welfare state." By 1950, Britain had embarked on a revolutionary transformation of its welfare system. It established the National Health Service in 1948 and built a comprehensive social security framework. These changes dismantled the centuries-old Poor Law system and ushered in an entirely new approach to addressing poverty and social need.

== Since 1950 ==
The "Welfare state and its income support programs, and aid to economically depressed industrial areas have been main concerns of British national politics since the 1950s.

=== 1950s: poverty "disappears" and reappears ===
In the early-1950s, it was widely believed that poverty had been all but abolished from Britain, with only a few isolated pockets of deprivation still remaining. The statistical index of overall inequality was the lowest ever, and people assumed that meant that the bottom group was much smaller. (Actually, the top group was not as rich) Indeed a 1950 study showed that only 1.5% of the survey population lived in poverty, compared with 18% in 1936. A leader in The Times spoke positively of this "remarkable improvement – no less than the virtual abolition of the sheerest want." Over the subsequent two decades, new research by Peter Townsend and other sociologists challenged the earlier optimistic conclusion, leading to a "rediscovery" of poverty. Various surveys and academic studies now estimated that about 4% to 12% of the population lived below the Supplementary Benefits' scales. Thus in Poverty in Britain and the Reform of Social Security (1969), Professor A. B. Atkinson estimated 2 to 5 million Britons lived in poverty. When he included the 2.6 million people officially in receipt of Supplementary Benefits, the minimum proportion of the population living on or below the poverty line was estimated at at least 10%. Some 22% were at or near the poverty line. In their 1965 study, "The Poor and the Poorest", Professors Peter Townsend and Brian Abel-Smith estimated 14% (7.5 million) were living in poverty. Furthermore, they estimated that the percentage of the population living in poverty had sharply increased from 8% to 14% since the mid-1950s.

==== Differences in health between the classes ====
The continued existence of poverty in the 1960s was also characterised by differences in health between different social classes. In 1964-65, the incidence of infant deaths was more than half as much higher in the two lowest social classes than in the two highest social classes. In 1961-62, 28% of all men recorded at least one spell of sickness of four days or more. For the lowest social classes, however, 35% of men had experienced this, compared with 18% of men in the highest social classes. There is evidence that in large families the height of children was less than that for the average, while families with three or more children were more likely to be inadequately nourished.

== See also ==
- Almshouse
- English poor laws
  - Tudor poor laws
- History of the welfare state in the United Kingdom
- History of poverty in the United States
- Low income housing
- Poor relief
- Poverty reduction
- Scottish poorhouse

== Bibliography ==
- Arkell, Tom. "The incidence of poverty in England in the later seventeenth century." Social History 12.1 (1987): 23-47.
- Beier, A.L. The Problem of the Poor in Tudor and Stuart England (1983)
- Botelho, L. A. Old age and the English poor law, 1500-1700 (2004) online
- Brundage, Anthony. The making of the new Poor law: the politics of inquiry, enactment, and implementation, 1832-1839 (Rutgers UP, 1978) online
- Buer, M.C. Health, Wealth and Population in the Early Days of the Industrial Revolution (1926) online
- Chadwick, W. Edward. The church, the state, and the poor: a series of historical sketches (Robert Scott, 1914) online
- Charlton, John, ed. The health of adult Britain, 1841-1994 (1997) online v1
- Clark, G. "The condition of the working class in England, 1209–2004" Journal of Political Economy (2005) 113: 1307–1340. https://doi.org/10.1086/498123
- Coats, A.W. ed. Poverty in the Victorian age; debates on the issue from 19th century critical journals (4 vol. Gregg, 1973) online
- Driver, Felix. Power and pauperism : the workhouse system, 1834-1884 (2004)
- Daunton, Martin J. Progress and Poverty: An Economic and Social History of Britain, 1700–1850 (Oxford University Press, 1985) online
- Dyer, Christopher. "The experience of being poor in late medieval England." Experiences of Poverty in Late Medieval and Early Modern England and France (Routledge, 2016) pp.19–39.
- Flinn, M. W. “Trends in Real Wages, 1750-1850.” Economic History Review, 27#3 1974, pp. 395–413. online
- Feinstein, Charles H. "Pessimism perpetuated: real wages and the standard of living in Britain during and after the industrial revolution." Journal of Economic History 58.3 (1998): 625-658.
- Gillin, John Lewis. Poverty and dependency: their relief and prevention (1917) wide-ranging survey of survey of early 20th century in US, UK and Europe online
- Goose, Nigel; Caffrey, Helen; Langley, Anne, eds. (2016). The British Almshouse: new perspectives on philanthropy ca 1400-1914. Milton Keynes: Family and Community Historical Research Society (FACHRS). ISBN 978-0-954-81802-9.
- Henriques, Ursula R.Q. Before the welfare state: social administration in early industrial Britain (Longman, 1979). online
- Heritage, Tom. "Poverty, old age and outdoor relief in late-Victorian England" Social History (2024) 40#1 pp.26–52
- Himmelfarb, Gertrude. The Idea of Poverty: England in the Early Industrial Age (1983 online*
  - Himmelfarb, Gertrude. "The idea of poverty." History Today 34.4 (1984), an excerpt from the book
- Horrell, Sara, Jane Humphries, and Jacob Weisdorf. "Beyond the male breadwinner: Life‐cycle living standards of intact and disrupted English working families, 1260–1850." The Economic History Review 75.2 (2022): 530-560. online
- Hurren, Elizabeth T. Protesting about Pauperism: Poverty, politics and poor relief in Late-Victorian England, 1870-1900 (Boydell & Brewer, 2015). excerpt
- Jones, Margaret, and Rodney Lowe, eds. From Beveridge to Blair: the first fifty years of Britain's welfare state 1948-98 (Manchester UP, 2002) online.
- Knott, John. Popular opposition to the 1834 Poor Law (Croom Helm, 1986) online
- Levine-Clark, Marjorie. Unemployment, Welfare, and Masculine Citizenship: So Much Honest Poverty in Britain, 1870-1930 (Springer, 2015).
- Marshall, Dorothy. The English Poor in the Eighteenth Century: A Study in Social and Administrative History (Routledge, 1926) online
- Murray, Peter. Poverty and welfare, 1830-1914 (Hodder & Stoughton, 1999) online
- Perry, Matt. Bread and Work - The Experience of Unemployment 1918-39 (Pluto Press, 2000) excerpt
- Platt, Lucinda. "Poverty studies and social research." in The Palgrave Handbook of Sociology in Britain (Palgrave Macmillan UK, 2014). 30-53.
- Poynter, J. R. Society and pauperism: English ideas on poor relief, 1795–1834 (U of Toronto Press, 1969).
- Rees, Rosemary et al. Poverty and public health 1815–1948 (Heinemann, 2001). online, Broad ranging history designed as undergraduate textbook.
- Rose, Michael E. The relief of poverty, 1834-1914 (1986)
- Rowntree, B. Seebohm. Poverty: A Study Of Town Life (1902) online
- Rowntree B. Seebohm. Poverty And Progress: A second social survey of York. (1942) online
- Slack, Paul. The English poor law, 1531-1782 (Cambridge University Press, 1995)
- Smith, George Davey et al. eds. Poverty, inequality and health in Britain: 1800-2000: A reader (Polity, 2001)
- Smith, N. J. Poverty in England, 1601-1936 (1972) onlline
- Smith, Noel, and Sue Middleton. "A review of poverty dynamics research in the UK." (Loughborough University, 2007). online
- Taylor, Arthur J. "Progress and Poverty in Britain, 1780–1850: A Reappraisal." History 45.153 (1960): 16-31. online
- Timmins, Nicholas. The Five GGiants: A Biography of the Welfare State (1995) online
- Wrightson, Keith. English Society 1580–1680 (Routledge, 2013).
- Wood, Peter. Poverty and the workhouse in Victorian Britain (Alan Sutton, 1991) online
