= National Living Wage =

Minimum wage in United Kingdom

The National Living Wage is an obligatory minimum wage payable to workers in the United Kingdom aged 21 (Note: Originally 25, then 23) and over which came into effect on 1 April 2016. As of 1 April 2026 it is £12.71 per hour. It was implemented at a significantly higher rate than the national minimum wage rate for workers under 25, and was expected (in 2015) to rise to at least £9 per hour by 2020. The consultation document issued by the Low Pay Commission in 2019 indicated that this target would not be met, instead proposing a figure of £8.67 per hour for the over-23 rate. The target figure of £9 per hour was reached in 2022.

== History ==
The then Chancellor of the Exchequer George Osborne announced, at the end of his budget speech on 8 July 2015, a new national minimum wage rate for people over the age of 25, which he termed the "National Living Wage". The National Living Wage is implemented via an amendment to the National Minimum Wage Act 1998.

The National Living Wage was phased in between April 2016 and April 2020, with the aim of reaching 60% of median UK earnings by 2020. For over-25 year old employees, the wage began at £7.20 per hour in April 2016 and was projected to rise to at least £9 per hour by April 2020. Smaller employers have had their employer National Insurance discounts increased to mitigate the higher costs of the National Living Wage. In September 2015 the proposed penalties for employer non-compliance were announced. They are double those previously payable for non-compliance with the National Minimum Wage Act 1998 (increased from 100% of arrears owed to 200%), although this is halved if paid within 14 days. The maximum penalty remains at £20,000 per worker. An additional penalty of disqualification from being a company director for up to 15 years will also be available to the courts. The enforcement budget is due to double, and the creation of a dedicated HM Revenue and Customs non-compliance team to pursue criminal prosecutions was announced.

HM Treasury initially projected that 2.7 million workers would benefit directly. Research published by the Resolution Foundation in March 2016 indicated that the introduction of the measure would immediately raise the incomes of those on minimum wage by 10.8%. The number of workers affected was expected to be about 4.5 million, forming between 3% and 30% of the workforce in a given area depending on the location. The total of workers affected was expected to rise to 6 million in 2020 if a £9-an-hour minimum had been established by then.

In November 2023, Jeremy Hunt announced that all workers over 21 would receive the National Living Wage of £11.44 per hour from April 2024 onwards.

== Reaction ==
A survey conducted in November 2015 by the Resolution Foundation and the Chartered Institute of Personnel and Development revealed that the policy is expected to have its greatest impact in the retail, hospitality and healthcare sectors. The policy has received criticism from some large employers, particularly supermarkets and the food and drink sector, where profits may be reduced by up to 10%. Some large employers have said that they may pass on the additional cost to consumers in the form of higher prices and some intend to improve productivity. The supermarket chain Lidl has said it will implement a “living wage” without increasing any of its prices. A report by Moody's Investors Service stated supermarkets may employ a higher proportion of under-25-year-olds to reduce employee costs. The Office for Budget Responsibility estimates the policy will result in 60,000 fewer jobs, equivalent to a 0.2% increase in the unemployment rate.

The announcement of the National Living Wage was seen as a political coup for the Conservative government because the opposition Labour Party had proposed that the national minimum wage rise only to £8 per hour. Opponents have objected to the government's use of the term "living wage" on the grounds that the National Living Wage is calculated from median UK earnings rather than the cost of living. Although the policy is called a "living wage", it does not meet with internationally agreed definitions of a living wage. An independently calculated living wage for the UK, sometimes called a "real living wage" to distinguish it from the National Living Wage, is published annually by the Living Wage Foundation.

== See also ==
- Basic income
- Guaranteed minimum income
- Living wage
- Maximum wage
- Minimum wage
- Minimum wage law in the UK
- Universal Credit
- Working poor
