= Wages Councils Act 1945 =

Act of the Parliament of the United Kingdom

Wages Councils Act 1945 (Note: Section 25(1).)
- Act of Parliament
- Parliament of the United Kingdom
- Long title: An Act to provide for the establishment of wages councils, and otherwise for the regulation of the remuneration and conditions of employment of workers in certain circumstances.
- Citation: 8 & 9 Geo. 6. c. 17
- Territorial extent: England and Wales; Scotland; (Note: Section 25(2).)

Dates
- Royal assent: 28 March 1945
- Commencement: 28 March 1945 (Note: The Acts of Parliament (Commencement) Act 1793.)
- Repealed: 29 August 1959
Other legislation
Repealed by	Wages Councils Act 1959

Status: Repealed

Text of statute as originally enacted

The Wages Councils Act 1945 (8 & 9 Geo. 6. c. 17) was an act of the Parliament of the United Kingdom, concerning the setting of minimum wages and encouraging collective bargaining. The act played a central role in post-war UK labour law.

== Subsequent developments ==
The whole act was repealed by section 26 of, and the sixth schedule to, the Wages Councils Act 1959 (7 & 8 Eliz. 2. c. 69), which came into force on 29 July 1959.

== See also ==
- UK labour law
- Trade Boards Act 1909
- Trade Boards Act 1918
- National Minimum Wage Act 1998
