= National Minimum Wage Act 1998 =

Act of the Parliament of the United Kingdom

National Minimum Wage Act 1998 (Note: Section 56(1).)
- Act of Parliament
- Parliament of the United Kingdom
- Long title: An Act to make provision for and in connection with a national minimum wage; to provide for the amendment of certain enactments relating to the remuneration of persons employed in agriculture; and for connected purposes.
- Citation: 1998 c. 39
- Introduced by: Margaret Beckett, President of the Board of Trade
- Territorial extent: United Kingdom (Note: Section 56(3).)

Dates
- Royal assent: 31 July 1998
- Commencement: Various (Note: Section 56(2).)
Other legislation
Amends	Agricultural Wages Act 1948; House of Commons Disqualification Act 1975; Education (Scotland) Act 1980; Employment Tribunals Act 1996; Employment Rights Act 1996
Amended by	Employment Relations Act 1999; Statute Law (Repeals) Act 2004; Immigration, Asylum and Nationality Act 2006; Employment Rights Act 2025

Status: Amended

Text of statute as originally enacted

Revised text of statute as amended

The National Minimum Wage Act 1998 (c. 39) is an act of the Parliament of the United Kingdom that created a minimum wage across the United Kingdom. From 1 April 2026 the minimum wage is £12.71 per hour for people aged 21 and over, £10.85 for people aged 18-20, and £7.55 for people aged under 18 and apprentices aged under 19 or in the first year of their apprenticeship.

It was a flagship policy of the Labour Party in the UK during their successful 1997 general election campaign. The national minimum wage (NMW) took effect on 1 April 1999. On 1 April 2016, an amendment to the act attempted an obligatory "National Living Wage" for workers over 25 (now extended to workers aged 21 and over), which was implemented at a significantly higher minimum wage rate of £7.20. This was expected to rise to at least £9 per hour by 2020, but in reality by that year it had only reached £8.72 per hour.

== Background ==
No national minimum wage existed prior to 1998, although there were a variety of systems of wage controls focused on specific industries under the Trade Boards Act 1909. The Wages Councils Act 1945 and subsequent acts applied sectoral minimum wages. These were gradually dismantled until the Trade Union Reform and Employment Rights Act 1993 abolished the 26 final wages councils, which had protected around 2,500,000 low-paid workers.

Much of the Labour Party had long opposed a government minimum wage because they feared that would reduce the need for joining trade unions, which they supported.

Part of the reason for the shift in Labour's minimum wage policy was the decline of trade union membership over recent decades (weakening employees' bargaining power), as well as a recognition that the employees most vulnerable to low pay, especially in service industries, were rarely unionised in the first place. Labour had returned to government in 1997 after 18 years in opposition, and a minimum wage had been a party policy since as far back as 1986, under the leadership of Neil Kinnock.

The implementation of a minimum wage was opposed by the Conservative Party and supported by the Liberal Democrats.

== Overview ==
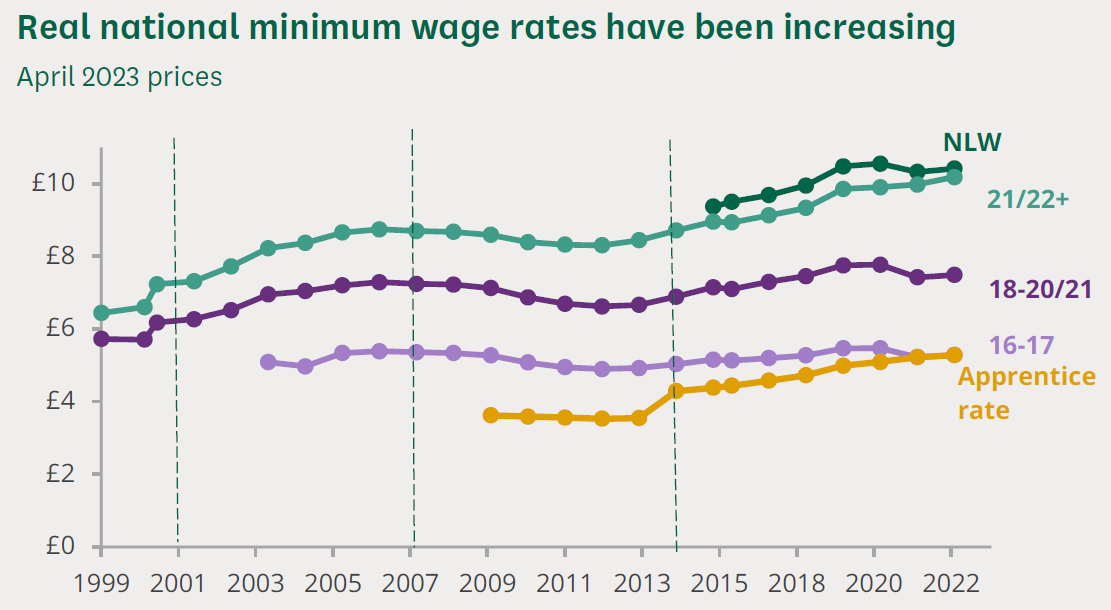
Real national minimum wages 1999–2022, adjusted to April 2023 prices.

The NMW rates are reviewed each year by the Low Pay Commission, which makes recommendations for change to the Government.

The following rates apply as of April 2026:

- £12.71 per hour for workers aged 21 and over
- £10.85 per hour for workers aged 18–20
- £8 per hour for apprentices and workers aged under 18

In his 2015 budget, George Osborne announced that from 1 April 2016, a further rate known as the "National Living Wage" ("NLW") would apply to those aged 25 or over at the rate of £7.20 per hour. This was successfully introduced into legislation. The minimum age threshold was decreased to 23 in April 2021.

In November 2023, Jeremy Hunt announced that all workers over 21 would receive the National Living Wage from April 2024 onwards.

== Law ==
Raw data
House of Commons Library: National Minimum Wage statistics.

The National Minimum Wage Act 1998 applies to workers (section 1(2)), that is, employees, and anyone who has a contract to do work personally, other than for a customer or a client (section 54(3)). Those working through agencies are included (section 34), so that the agencies' charges must not reduce a worker's basic entitlement. Home-workers are also included, and the Secretary of State can make order for other inclusions.

The Secretary of State can also make exclusions, as has been done for au pairs and family members in a family business. Sections 43 through 45 delineate excluded groups of workers, such as unpaid volunteers, prisoners, and share fishermen paid by a share of profits. Inserted by the Immigration, Asylum and Nationality Act 2006, section 45B excludes persons detained in removal centres, which are long-term detention facilities for immigrants and asylum seekers.

The hours that are used in a national minimum wage calculation are dependent upon work type as defined within the National Minimum Wage Regulations 1999. The different work types are time work, salaried hours work, output work and unmeasured work. Hours to be paid for are those worked in the "pay reference period", but where pay is not contractually referable to hours, such as pay by output, then the time actually worked must be ascertained. The principle is that the rate of pay for hours worked should not fall below the minimum. Periods when the worker is on industrial action, travelling to and from work and absent are excluded. A worker who is required to be awake and available for work must receive the minimum rate. This does not prevent the use of "zero hour contracts", where the worker is guaranteed no hours and is under no obligation to work.

=== Workers' rights ===
Section 10 permits a worker to issue a "production notice" to their employer requesting access to the employer's records if they believe that their pay may be, or have been, below the national minimum wage.

=== Enforcement ===
The NMW is enforceable by HMRC (section 14), or by the worker making a contractual claim or through a "wrongful deduction" claim under Part II of the Employment Rights Act 1996. Section 18 provides for compensation. Employers must not subject their workers to dismissal or any other detriment (section 25 and section 23).

In October 2013, new rules to publicise the names of employers paying under the minimum wage were established; the names of most employers issued with a Notice of Underpayment are published. In 2014, the names of 30 employers were released by the Department for Business, Innovation and Skills. In 2017, the names of 852 employers were released by the Department for Business, Energy and Industrial Strategy.

Failure to pay underpayments after issue of a notice of underpayment results in payment of a financial penalty to the Secretary of State. In 2016, arrangements were made to ensure that underpayments result in double-level financial penalty. The Low Pay Commission has highlighted that apprentices are particularly exposed to being underpaid.

National Minimum Wage (Enforcement Notices) Act 2003
- Act of Parliament
- Parliament of the United Kingdom
- Long title: An Act to make provision enabling an enforcement notice under section 19 of the National Minimum Wage Act 1998 to impose a requirement under subsection (2) of that section in relation to a person, whether or not a requirement under subsection (1) of that section is, or may be, imposed in relation to that or any other person; and to limit the pay reference periods in respect of which a requirement under subsection (2) of that section may be imposed.
- Citation: 2003 c. 8
- Territorial extent: United Kingdom

Dates
- Royal assent: 8 May 2003
- Commencement: 8 July 2003
- Repealed: 6 April 2009
Other legislation
Repealed by	Employment Act 2008
Relates to	National Minimum Wage Act 1998

Status: Repealed

Text of statute as originally enacted

The National Minimum Wage (Enforcement Notices) Act 2003 (c. 8) amended the 1998 act to allow employees to claim back payments from a previous employer of an employee in cases where the previous employer failed to pay them the minimum wage.

=== The Case law ===
- Revenue and Customs Commissioners v Annabel's (Berkeley Square) Ltd [2009] EWCA Civ 361, [2009] ICR 1123
- Spackman v LMU [2007] IRLR 741, entitlement to payment of wages

== Statistics ==
Comparisons of the changes in the National Minimum Wage to average earnings and inflation. The minimum wage has grown well ahead of both.

The Office for National Statistics produces information about the lower end of the earnings distribution and estimates for the number of jobs paid below the national minimum wage. The figures are based on data from the Annual Survey of Hours and Earnings.

== Perspectives ==
The policy was opposed by the Conservative Party at the time of implementation, who argued that it would create extra costs for businesses and would cause unemployment. In 1996, The Conservative Party's future leader, David Cameron, standing as a prospective Member of Parliament for Stafford, had said that the minimum wage "would send unemployment straight back up". However, in 2005 Cameron stated that: "I think the minimum wage has been a success, yes. It turned out much better than many people expected, including the CBI." It is now Conservative Party policy to support the minimum wage.

Mayor of London, Boris Johnson, future Conservative Prime Minister, supported the London living wage, ensuring that all City Hall employees and subcontracted workers earn at least £7.60 an hour and promoting the wage to employers across the city. In May 2009, his Greater London Authority Economics unit raised the London Living Wage for City Hall employees to its current rate of £7.60, £1.80 more than the legal minimum rate of £5.80.

Full-time workers are entitled to a minimum of 5.6 weeks paid holiday per year from 1 April 2009, with pro-rata equivalent for part-time workers. This includes public holidays.

At the September 2021 Labour Party Conference, Labour Party members voted in favour of a £15 an hour minimum wage. The motion calling for a £15 an hour minimum wage was put forward by the Unite union. Then Labour Party leader Keir Starmer and his leadership team did not indicate a preference either in favour or against the motion. Although it was presumed that they were unlikely to adopt the policy. Organisations who support a £15 an hour minimum wage include: the Green Party of England and Wales, the Bakers, Food and Allied Workers' Union (BFAWU), the Trades Union Congress, and the GMB trade union, who call for "the National Minimum Wage to be replaced with a Real Living Wage rate" at £15 for all ages.

== Current and past rates ==
Source unless otherwise specified: Low Pay Commission
From	Age 21+		Age 18–20	Age 16–17 and apprentices	
1 April 2026	£12.71		£10.85	£8.00	
1 April 2025	£12.21		£10.00	£7.55	
1 April 2024	£11.44		£8.60	£6.40	
From	Age 23+	Age 21–22	Age 18–20	Age 16–17 and apprentices	
1 April 2023	£10.42	£10.18	£7.49	£5.28	
1 April 2022	£9.50	£9.18	£6.83	£4.81	
From	Age 23+	Age 21–22	Age 18–20	Age 16–17	Apprentices
1 April 2021	£8.91	£8.36	£6.56	£4.62	£4.30
From	Age 25+	Age 21–24	Age 18–20	Age 16–17	Apprentices
1 April 2020	£8.72	£8.20	£6.45	£4.55	£4.15
1 April 2019	£8.21	£7.70	£6.15	£4.35	£3.90
1 April 2018	£7.83	£7.38	£5.90	£4.20	£3.70
1 April 2017	£7.50	£7.05	£5.60	£4.05	£3.50
1 October 2016	£7.20	£6.95	£5.55	£4.00	£3.40
1 April 2016	£7.20	£6.70	£5.30	£3.87	£3.30
From	Age 21+		Age 18–20	Age 16–17	Apprentices
1 October 2014	£6.50		£5.13	£3.79	£2.73
1 October 2013	£6.31		£5.03	£3.72	£2.68
1 October 2012	£6.19		£4.98	£3.68	£2.65
1 October 2011	£6.08		£4.98	£3.68	£2.60
1 October 2010	£5.93		£4.92	£3.64	£2.50
From	Age 22+		Age 18–21	Age 16–17	
1 October 2009	£5.80		£4.83	£3.57	
1 October 2008	£5.73		£4.70	£3.53	
1 October 2007	£5.52		£4.60	£3.53	
1 October 2006	£5.35		£4.45	£3.40	
1 October 2005	£5.05		£4.25	£3.00	
1 October 2004	£4.85		£4.10	£3.00	
1 October 2003	£4.50		£3.80	£3.00	
1 October 2002	£4.20		£3.50	—N/a	
1 October 2001	£4.10		£3.50	—N/a	
1 October 2000	£3.70		£3.20	—N/a	
1 April 1999	£3.60		£3.00	—N/a	

== See also ==
- History of the minimum wage
- Minimum wage
- List of countries by minimum wage
- United Kingdom labour law
- Ex parte H.V. McKay (1907) 2 CAR 1, Australian labour law case on the living wage
- S Webb and B Webb, Industrial Democracy (1898)
- Liberal welfare reforms
- Trade Boards Act 1909
- Trade Boards Act 1918
- Wages Councils Act 1945
- Tax credits, child tax credit, Working Tax Credit
- Wage regulation
- Fair Labor Standards Act of 1938, which introduced the minimum wage in the US
- Incomes policy

== Sources ==
- E McGaughey, A Casebook on Labour Law (Hart 2019) ch 6(1)
- B Simpson, 'A Milestone in the Legal Regulation of Pay' (1999) 28 ILJ 1, 17–18
- B Simpson, 'The National Minimum Wage Five Years On' (2004) 33 ILJ 22
