= Trade Boards Act 1909 =

Act of the Parliament of the United Kingdom

Trade Boards Act 1909 (Note: Section 22(1).)
- Act of Parliament
- Parliament of the United Kingdom
- Long title: An Act to provide for the establishment of Trade Boards for certain Trades.
- Citation: 9 Edw. 7. c. 22
- Territorial extent: United Kingdom

Dates
- Royal assent: 20 October 1909
- Commencement: 1 January 1910 (Note: Section 22(2).)
- Repealed: Northern Ireland: England and Wales and Scotland: 28 March 1945
Other legislation
Repealed by	Northern Ireland: Trade Boards Act (Northern Ireland) 1923; England and Wales and Scotland: Wages Councils Act 1945
Relates to	Trade Boards Act 1918

Status: Repealed

Text of statute as originally enacted

The Trade Boards Act 1909 (9 Edw. 7. c. 22) was an act of the Parliament of the United Kingdom passed in 1909. It provided for the creation of boards which could set minimum wage criteria that were legally enforceable. It was expanded and updated in the Trade Boards Act 1918. The main provision was to set minimum wages in certain trades with historically low wages, often due to a surplus of available workers due to the widespread employment of workers or lack of skills needed for employment.

At first it applied to four industries: chain-making, ready-made tailoring, paper-box making, machine-made lace making, and finishing trades. It was later expanded in 1912: mining and then to other industries with a preponderance of unskilled manual labour.

== Background ==
The act was introduced to counteract the current system referred to as "sweating" that was used in British Trades. The term was used to describe harsh conditions like long hours, unsanitary work environments and inadequate wages.By the early twentieth century, there was a serious pressure among reformers as well as other affected workers to combat these brutal conditions. The workers addressed the issues through government intervention. They felt like relying on market forces to rectify the conditions may never solve anything. An impressive exhibition on sweated industries staged in western London in the summer of 1906 drew nearly 30,000 visitors over a six week period. This shed light on the plight of the sweated workers and is credited with helping towards the development of the 1909 Trade Boards Act.

== Debates ==
The act was very controversial from its introduction. It provoked strong disagreements among contemporaries over whether it had enough strength to address low pay. Supporters such as the social reformer R. H. Tawney and Churchill saw it as a great breakthrough combating exploitative working conditions. Critics such as Ramsay MacDonald argued that the Trade Boards Act did not go far enough. They claimed that it set wages according to what industries could afford instead of what a liveable wage was.

Winston Churchill, MP then President of the Board of Trade, put the argument for the legislation as follows:

It is a serious national evil that any class of His Majesty's subjects should receive less than a living wage in return for their utmost exertions. It was formerly supposed that the working of the laws of supply and demand would naturally regulate or eliminate that evil. The first clear division which we make on the question to-day is between healthy and unhealthy conditions of bargaining. That is the first broad division which we make in the general statement that the laws of supply and demand will ultimately produce a fair price. Where in the great staple trades in the country you have a powerful organisation on both sides, where you have responsible leaders able to bind their constituents to their decision, where that organisation is conjoint with an automatic scale of wages or arrangements for avoiding a deadlock by means of arbitration, there you have a healthy bargaining which increases the competitive power of the industry, enforces a progressive standard of life and the productive scale, and continually weaves capital and labour more closely together. But where you have what we call sweated trades, you have no organisation, no parity of bargaining, the good employer is undercut by the bad, and the bad employer is undercut by the worst; the worker, whose whole livelihood depends upon the industry, is undersold by the worker who only takes the trade up as a second string, his feebleness and ignorance generally renders the worker an easy prey to the tyranny; of the masters and middle-men, only a step higher up the ladder than the worker, and held in the same relentless grip of forces—where those conditions prevail you have not a condition of progress, but a condition of progressive degeneration.

== Impact ==
In the chain-making trade, one of the four original industries covered by the Act, conditions before the Board's intervention had been severe. Prices paid for common chain had fallen by up to 32 percent over the two decades leading up to 1910. The largest group of women outworkers earned only up to five shillings a week, no higher than in the late 1880s. After the trade board issued its first minimum rate determination in 1910, some employees attempted to evade it. For example, they raised charges for the use of tools by as much as 50 percent as well as paying for great quality chain at low quality prices. The Act's effect was also uneven across the workforce. The earnings for factory based male chain makers grew considerably, while the outworkers' earnings remained constant or dropped. It is also important to note that the outworkers were generally women who worked from home. Economist R.H. Tawney, who studied the trade in detail, came to the conclusion that without the trade board's intervention, the conditions for outworkers would have likely remained the same as in previous decades. His conclusions also suggest the Act brought strong improvement in at least one of its original trades, even as enforcement problems and uneven benefits limited its impact.

== Subsequent developments ==
The whole act was repealed for England and Wales and Scotland by section 25(3) of, and the fourth schedule to, the Wages Councils Act 1945 (8 & 9 Geo. 6. c. 17), which came into force on 28 March 1945

== See also ==
- UK labour law
- Trade Boards Act 1918
- Wages Councils Act 1945
- National Minimum Wage Act 1998
- S Webb and B Webb, Industrial Democracy (1898)
- Liberal reforms
- History of the welfare state in the United Kingdom
