= Trade Boards Act 1918 =

Act of the Parliament of the United Kingdom

Trade Boards Act 1918 (Note: Section 13(1).)
- Act of Parliament
- Parliament of the United Kingdom
- Long title: An Act to amend the Trade Boards Act, 1909.
- Citation: 8 & 9 Geo. 5. c. 32
- Territorial extent: United Kingdom

Dates
- Royal assent: 8 August 1918
- Commencement: 1 October 1918 (Note: Section 13(2).)
- Repealed: 28 March 1945
Other legislation
Amends	Trade Boards Act 1909
Repealed by	Wages Councils Act 1945

Status: Repealed

Text of statute as originally enacted

The Trade Boards Act 1918 (8 & 9 Geo. 5. c. 32) was an act of the Parliament of the United Kingdom that heavily shaped the post-World War I system of UK labour law, particularly regarding collective bargaining and the establishment of minimum wages. It was the result of the second of five Whitley Committee reports.

== Background ==
The act extended the piecemeal system for tackling sweated labour begun under the Trade Boards Act 1909 (9 Edw. 7. c. 22) . The second reading took place on 17 June 1918. It received royal assent on 8 August 1918.

== Case law ==
- Pauley v Kenaldo Ld [1953] 1 W.L.R. 187
- Hulland v William Sanders & Son [1945] K.B. 78, extension of terms
- National Association of Local Government Officers v Bolton Corp [1943] A.C. 166
- Nathan v Gulkoff & Levy Ltd [1933] Ch. 809
- R v Minister of Labour Ex p. National Trade Defence Association [1932] 1 K.B. 1
- France v James Coombes and Company [1929] AC 496
- Skinner v Jack Breach Ltd [1927] 2 K.B. 220

== Subsequent developments ==
The whole act was repealed by section 25(3) of, and the fourth schedule to, the Wages Councils Act 1945 (8 & 9 Geo. 6. c. 17), which came into force on 28 March 1945

== See also ==
- UK labour law
- Trade Boards Act 1909
- Wages Councils Act 1945
- National Minimum Wage Act 1998
- Liberal reforms
