= Brighton and Hove City Council elections =

English local government elections

Brighton and Hove City Council is a unitary authority in East Sussex, England. It was created as Brighton and Hove Borough Council on 1 April 1997 replacing Brighton and Hove Borough Councils. It was granted city status in 2001.

== Council elections ==
See Brighton Borough Council elections or Hove Borough Council elections for election prior to 1996

- 1996 Brighton and Hove Borough Council election
- 1999 Brighton and Hove Borough Council election
- 2003 Brighton and Hove City Council election (New ward boundaries)
- 2007 Brighton and Hove City Council election
- 2011 Brighton and Hove City Council election
- 2015 Brighton and Hove City Council election
- 2019 Brighton and Hove City Council election
- 2023 Brighton and Hove City Council election

=== Overview ===
==== Election results ====
Year	Labour	Conservative	Green	Liberal Democrats (Note: Includes totals for the predecessors of the Liberal Democrats, the Liberal Party and SDP (both of which participated in the Alliance).)	Independents & Others	Council control after election
Council established from the merger of Brighton and Hove (78 seats)
1996	54	23	1	0	0	Labour
1999	45	27	3	3	0	Labour
New ward boundaries (54 seats)
2003	24	20	6	3	1	No overall control
2007	13	26	12	2	1	No overall control
2011	13	18	23	0	0	No overall control
2015	23	20	11	0	0	No overall control
2019	20	14	19	0	1	No overall control
New ward boundaries (54 seats)
2023	38	6	7	0	3 (Note: Including 2 Brighton & Hove Independents)	Labour

Party political make-up of Brighton and Hove City Council
Party	Seats								Council composition May 2023
Party	1996	1999	2003	2007	2011	2015	2019	2023	Council composition May 2023
Green	1	3	6	12	23	11	19	7	
Conservative	23	27	20	26	18	20	14	6	
Labour	54	45	24	13	13	23	20	38	
Independent	0	0	1	1	0	0	1	1	
Liberal Democrats	0	3	2	0	0	0	0	0	
Brighton and Hove Independents	0	0	0	0	0	0	0	2	

== District result maps ==
2003 results map

2007 results map

2011 results map

2015 results map

2019 results map

2023 results map

== Wards ==
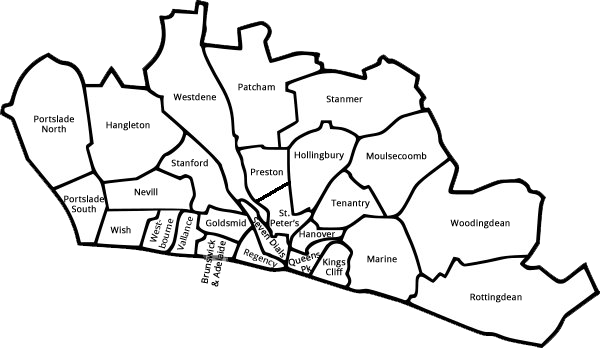
Ward of Brighton and Hove Borough Council 1996–2003

For the first election in 1996 the wards of the former Borough of Brighton and Borough of Hove were used. There were originally 26 wards each with three councillors each, totalling 78 councillors in the newly created Brighton and Hove Borough Council:

- Brunswick & Adelaide
- Goldsmid
- Hangleton
- Hanover
- Hollingbury
- Kings Cliff
- Marine
- Moulsecoomb
- Nevill
- North Portslade
- Patcham
- Portslade South
- Preston
- Queen's Park
- Regency
- Rottingdean
- Seven Dials
- St. Peters
- Stanford
- Stanmer
- Tenantry
- Vallance
- Westbourne
- Westdene
- Wish
- Woodingdean

Results of the 2003 elections, showing the wards as existed from 2003 to 2023

The 2001 boundary review reduced the wards to 21 wards with a mix of two or three councillors each totalling 54 councillors for the then city council. These boundary were used in the 2003 election for the first time with the following wards:

- Brunswick & Adelaide
- Central Hove
- East Brighton
- Goldsmid
- Hangleton & Knoll
- Hanover & Elm Grove
- Hollingdean & Stanmer (known as Hollingbury & Stanmer until 2007)
- Hove Park (known as Stanford until 2007)
- Moulsecoomb & Bevendean
- North Portslade
- Patcham
- Preston Park
- Queen's Park
- Regency
- Rottingdean Coastal
- South Portslade
- St. Peter's & North Laine
- Westbourne
- Wish
- Withdean
- Woodingdean

Ward boundaries were reviewed again in 2023, since when the council has comprised 54 councillors representing 23 wards, with each ward electing two or three councillors. Elections are held every four years. The wards are:

- Brunswick and Adelaide
- Central Hove
- Coldean and Stanmer
- Goldsmid
- Hangleton and Knoll
- Hanover and Elm Grove
- Hollingdean and Fiveways
- Kemptown
- Moulsecoomb and Bevendean
- North Portslade
- Patcham and Hollingbury
- Preston Park
- Queen's Park
- Regency
- Rottingdean and West Saltdean
- Round Hill
- South Portslade
- West Hill and North Laine
- Westbourne and Poets' Corner
- Westdene and Hove Park
- Whitehawk and Marina
- Wish
- Woodingdean

== By-election results ==
=== Overview ===
Election	Date	Incumbent party	Result
Wish	1 May 1997	Labour	Labour
Hollingbury	24 July 1997	Labour	Labour
Portslade South	7 May 1998	Labour	Labour
Rottingdean	7 May 1998	Conservative	Conservative
Tenantry	1 September 1999	Labour	Labour
Goldsmid	7 June 2001	Conservative	Labour
Patcham	11 April 2002	Conservative	Conservative
Westdene	16 May 2002	Conservative	Conservative
Hangleton and Knoll	7 October 2004	Labour	Conservative
Regency	13 December 2007	Green	Green
Goldsmid	23 July 2009	Conservative	Green
St Peter's and North Laine	8 July 2010	Green	Green
Westbourne	22 December 2011	Conservative	Conservative
East Brighton	18 October 2012	Labour	Labour
Hanover and Elm Grove	11 July 2013	Green	Labour
East Brighton	4 August 2016	Labour	Labour
East Brighton	8 February 2018	Labour	Labour
Hollingdean and Stanmer	6 May 2021	Labour	Green
Patcham	6 May 2021	Conservative	Conservative
Rottingdean Coastal	5 May 2022	Conservative	Labour
Wish	8 December 2022	Conservative	Labour
South Portslade	11 January 2024	Labour	Labour
Queen's Park	2 May 2024	Labour	Labour
Kemptown	2 May 2024	Labour	Labour
Brunswick and Adelaide	4 July 2024	Labour	Green
Westbourne and Poets' Corner	1 May 2025	Labour	Labour
Queen’s Park	18 September 2025	Labour	Green

=== 1995–1999 ===
Wish by-election 1 May 1997
Party	Candidate	Votes	%	±%
Labour		2,054	43.5	−2.3
Conservative		1,771	37.5	−2.2
Hove Conservative		562	11.9	+11.9
Green		255	5.4	−0.8
Natural Law		84	1.8	+1.8
Majority		283	6.0	
Turnout		4,726		
Labour hold		Swing		

Hollingbury by-election 24 July 1997 (resignation of David Lepper upon being elected as MP)
Party	Candidate	Votes	%	±%
Labour		1,131	60.8	−6.3
Conservative		432	23.2	+9.6
Green		101	5.4	−4.4
Independent		95	5.1	+5.1
Liberal Democrats		68	3.7	−5.7
Socialist Labour		32	1.7	+1.7
Majority		699	37.6	
Turnout		1,859		
Labour hold		Swing		

Portslade South ward by-election 7 May 1998 (resignation of Ivor Caplin following election as MP in 1997)
Party	Candidate	Votes	%	±%
Labour	Les Hamilton	1,290	62.5	+3.2
Conservative	Ted Kemble	483	23.4	−2.7
Liberal Democrats	Nigel Donovan	217	10.5	−0.6
Green	Nigel Baker	74	3.6	+0.1
Majority		807	39.1	
Turnout		1,990	30.0	
Labour hold		Swing		

Rottingdean ward by-election 7 May 1998 (death of Cllr Shirley Wrigley)
Party	Candidate	Votes	%	±%
Conservative	David Smith	1,724	58.8	+6.1
Labour	Mark Bunting	803	27.4	+3.8
Liberal Democrats	Harold de Souza	319	10.9	−3.3
Green	Peter Poole	84	2.9	−0.5
Majority		921	31.4	
Turnout		2,930	38.0	
Conservative hold		Swing		

=== 1999–2003 ===
Tenantry by-election 30 September 1999 (resignation of Cllr Lord Bassam upon being made a government minister)
Party	Candidate	Votes	%	±%
Labour		789	51.9	−4.2
Conservative		383	25.2	+7.8
Green		147	9.7	−7.5
Independent		117	7.7	+7.7
Liberal Democrats		52	3.4	−6.0
Independent		33	2.2	+2.2
Majority		406	26.7	
Turnout		1,521	19.5	
Labour hold		Swing		

Goldsmid by-election 7 June 2001
Party	Candidate	Votes	%	±%
Labour	Vincent Meegan	1,690	37.0	−16.2
Conservative		1,640	35.9	+0.2
Liberal Democrats		577	12.6	+12.6
Green		481	10.5	−0.6
ProLife Alliance		119	2.6	+2.6
UKIP		57	1.2	+1.2
Majority		50	1.1	
Turnout		4,564		
Labour gain from Conservative		Swing		

Patcham by-election 11 April 2002
Party	Candidate	Votes	%	±%
Conservative	Brian Pidgeon	1,352	59.5	+4.3
Labour	Elizabeth Stewart	463	20.5	−10.1
Liberal Democrats	Trefor Hunter	336	14.9	+6.6
Green	Elizabeth Wakefield	107	4.7	−0.9
Majority		889	39.0	
Turnout		2,258	32.1	
Conservative hold		Swing		

Westdene by-election 16 May 2002
Party	Candidate	Votes	%	±%
Conservative	Ken Norman	1,347	55.5	+3.2
Labour	Malcolm Prescott	645	26.6	−0.9
Liberal Democrats	Don McBeth	234	9.6	+0.1
Green	Richard Mallender	199	8.2	−2.5
Majority		702	28.9	
Turnout		2,425	31.0	
Conservative hold		Swing		

=== 2003–2007 ===
Hangleton and Knoll by-election 7 October 2004
Party	Candidate	Votes	%	±%
Conservative	Dawn Barnett	1,535	42.1	+3.4
Labour	Eddy Sears	1,165	32.0	−8.3
Liberal Democrats	Mark Barnard	618	17.0	+8.8
Green	Elizabeth Wakefield	170	4.7	−2.4
Independent	Janet Berridge-Brown	156	4.3	+1.9
Majority		370	10.1	
Turnout		3,644	35.3	
Conservative gain from Labour		Swing		

=== 2007–2011 ===
Regency by-election 13 December 2007 (Resignation of Cllr. Hermione Roy for health reasons)
Party	Candidate	Votes	%	±%
Green	Jason Kitcat	749	41.6	+8.7
Conservative	Robert Nemeth	397	22.1	+2.1
Labour	Delia Forester	376	20.9	−0.6
Liberal Democrats	Simon Doyle	148	8.2	−9.1
Independent	Tony Davenport	130	7.2	−1.1
Majority		352	19.5	
Turnout		1,800	23.0	
Green hold		Swing		

Goldsmid by-election 23 July 2009 (resignation of Cllr. Paul Lainchbury due to financial reasons)
Party	Candidate	Votes	%	±%
Green	Alexandra Phillips	1,456	38.5	+17.2
Conservative	Andrew Wealls	1,104	29.1	+1.1
Labour	Lis Telcs	816	21.6	−4.4
Liberal Democrats	Howard Spencer	280	7.4	−7.8
UKIP	Maria McCallum	129	3.4	+3.4
Majority		352	9.3	
Turnout		3,792	32.9	−4.6
Green gain from Conservative		Swing		

St Peter's and North Laine by-election 8 July 2010 (resignation of Keith Taylor upon becoming a member of the European Parliament)
Party	Candidate	Votes	%	±%
Green	Lizzie Deane	1,816	56.8	+2.5%
Labour	Tom French	880	27.5	+4.3%
Conservative	Rob Buckwell	365	11.4	−0.7%
Liberal Democrats	Trefor Hunter	103	3.2	−4.9%
Independent	Gerald O’Brien	32	1.0	−1.3%
Majority		936	29.3	−1.8%
Turnout		3,196	24.1	−10%
Green hold		Swing		

=== 2011–2015 ===
Westbourne by-election 22 December 2011 (resignation of Brian Oxley)
Party	Candidate	Votes	%	±%
Conservative	Graham Cox	1,027	39.3	+0.9
Labour	Nigel Jenner	826	31.6	+2.2
Green	Louisa Greenbaum	645	24.6	+0.1
Liberal Democrats	Gareth Jones	45	1.7	−5.5
UKIP	Paul Perrin	36	1.4	+1.4
TUSC	Pip Tindall	20	0.8	+0.8
The European Citizens Party	Susan Collard	13	0.5	−0.1
Majority		201	7.7	
Turnout		2,612	35.0	−10.5%
Conservative hold		Swing		

East Brighton by-election 18 October 2012 (Resignation of Craig Turton)
Party	Candidate	Votes	%	±%
Labour	Chaun Wilson	1596	56.1	+6.59
Conservative	Joe Miller	531	18.6	−4.36
Green	Carlie Nicole Goldsmith	456	16.0	−5.49
UKIP	Sabiha Choudhury	148	5.2	+5.2
Liberal Democrats	Dominic Felix Sokalski	59	2.1	−2.78
TUSC	Jon Redford	55	1.9	+0.63
Majority		1,065	37.3	
Turnout		2,857	26.2%	−13.3%
Labour hold		Swing		

Hanover and Elm Grove by-election 11 July 2013 (resignation of Matt Follett)
Party	Candidate	Votes	%	±%
Labour	Emma Daniel	1396	39.8	+8.00
Green	David Stuart Gibson	1358	38.7	−14.43
Conservative	Robert John Knight	275	7.8	−1.02
UKIP	Patricia Ann Mountain	250	7.1	+7.13
TUSC	Phil Clarke	172	4.9	+1.88
Liberal Democrats	Lev Eakins	56	1.6	−1.56
Majority		38	1.1	
Turnout		3,520	29.2%	
Labour gain from Green		Swing		

=== 2015–2019 ===
Brighton East by-election 4 August 2016 (Resignation of Maggie Barradell)
Party	Candidate	Votes	%	±%
Labour	Lloyd Russell-Moyle	1,488	57.5	+11.1
Conservative	David Plant	514	19.9	−2.6
Green	Mitch Alexander	286	11.1	−8.5
UKIP	Leigh Farrow	152	5.9	N/A
Liberal Democrats	Andrew England	116	4.5	−3.4
Independent	Ramon Sammut	31	1.2	N/A
Majority		974	37.6	
Turnout		2,594	24.48	
Labour hold		Swing		

Brighton East by-election 8 February 2018 (resignation of Lloyd Russell-Moyle)
Party	Candidate	Votes	%	±%
Labour	Nancy Platts	1,889	67.5	+10.0
Conservative	Edward Wilson	481	17.2	−2.7
Green	Ed Baker	316	11.3	+0.2
Liberal Democrats	George Taylor	114	4.1	−0.4
Majority		1,408	50.3	
Turnout		2,800	27.34	
Labour hold		Swing		

=== 2019–2023 ===
Hollingdean and Stanmer by-election 6 May 2021 (resignation of Tracey Hill)
Party	Candidate	Votes	%	±%
Green	Zoë John	1,542	41.6	+2.6
Labour	Leila Erin-Jenkins	1,262	34.0	−9.7
Conservative	Emma Dawson-Bowling	745	20.1	+11.0
TUSC	Rob Somerton-Jones	54	1.5	N/A
Liberal Democrats	Alex Hargreaves	47	1.3	−4.7
UKIP	Des Jones	35	0.9	−7.5
Independent	Nigel Furness	24	0.6	N/A
Majority		280	7.5	
Turnout		3,709	31.9	
Green gain from Labour		Swing		

Patcham by-election 6 May 2021 (resignation of Lee Wares)
Party	Candidate	Votes	%	±%
Conservative	Anne Meadows	2,011	41.5	−10.3
Green	Eliza Wyatt	1,733	35.7	+8.6
Labour	Bruno de Oliveira	879	18.1	−7.2
Liberal Democrats	Madelaine Hunter-Taylor	174	3.6	N/A
UKIP	Charles Goodhand	50	1.0	N/A
Majority		278	5.7	
Turnout		4,847	43.8	
Conservative hold		Swing		

Rottingdean Coastal by-election 5 May 2022 (resignation of Joe Miller)
Party	Candidate	Votes	%	±%
Labour	Robert Mcintosh	1,443	29.6	+6.0
Independent	Stephen White	1,355	27.8	N/a
Conservative	Lynda Hyde	1,185	24.3	−8.3
Green	Libby Darling	504	10.3	−11.0
Independent	Alison Wright	222	4.6	N/A
Liberal Democrats	Stewart Stone	168	3.4	−11.5
Majority		88	1.8	
Turnout		4,896	44.0	−1.6
Labour gain from Conservative		Swing		

Wish by-election 8 December 2022 (death of Garry Peltzer Dunn)
Party	Candidate	Votes	%	±%
Labour	Bella Sankey	1,519	58.5	+27.9
Conservative	Peter Revell	756	29.1	−7.7
Green	Ollie Sykes	190	7.3	−16.1
Liberal Democrats	Stewart Stone	96	3.7	−2.6
UKIP	Patricia Mountain	34	1.3	−1.6
Majority		763	29.4	
Turnout		2,600	34.24	−16.89
Labour gain from Conservative		Swing	+17.8	

=== 2023–2027 ===
South Portslade by-election 11 January 2024 (resignation of Les Hamilton)
Party	Candidate	Votes	%	±%
Labour	Josh Guilmant	874	54.6	▼13.2
Conservative	Benjamin Franks	246	15.4	▲1.4
Liberal Democrats	Kenneth Rist	186	11.6	▲2.0
Green	Danny Booth	149	9.3	▼1.0
TUSC	David Maples	53	3.3	N/A
Democratic Liberation Party	Georgia McKinley Fitch	49	3.1	N/A
Independent	Jamie Gillespie	44	2.7	N/A
Majority		628	39.2	
Turnout		1,601		
Labour hold		Swing		

Queen’s Park by-election 2 May 2024 (resignation of Chandni Mistry)
Party	Candidate	Votes	%	±%
Labour	Milla Gauge	1,214	46.1	▼12.3
Green	Luke Walker	766	28.4	▲1.0
BHI	Adrian Hart	449	16.6	▲1.6
Conservative	Sunny Choudhury	168	6.2	▼2.3
Liberal Democrats	Dominique Hall	67	2.4	▼2.8
Majority		448	16.5	
Turnout		2,718	39.0	
Labour hold		Swing		

Kemptown ward by-election, 2 May 2024 (resignation of Bharti Gajjar)
Party	Candidate	Votes	%	±%
Labour	Théresa Ann Mackey	1,382	45.8	▼4.9
Green	Ricky Perrin	590	19.5	▼3.9
Liberal Democrats	Robert James Brown	406	13.4	▲3.8
BHI	Gary Farmer	369	12.2	▼2.3
Conservative	Josephine Victoria O’Carroll	222	7.4	▼2.4
Independent	Jamie Gillespie	44	1.5	
Majority		792	26.3	
Turnout		3,013	34.8	
Labour hold		Swing		

Brunswick and Adelaide by-election 4 July 2024 (resignation of Jilly Stevens)
Party	Candidate	Votes	%	±%
Green	Ollie Sykes	2,193	42.7	▲6.9
Labour	Alice Burton	1,873	36.4	▼2.9
BHI	Chris Woodley	588	11.4	▼7.5
Liberal Democrats	Claire Lachlan	389	7.6	▼2.3
Independent	Jamie Gillespie	98	1.9	N/A
Majority		320	6.2	
Turnout		5,141		
Green gain from Labour		Swing		

Westbourne & Poets’ Corner by-election 1 May 2025 (resignation of Leslie Pumm)
Party	Candidate	Votes	%	±%
Labour	Sam Parrott	894	32.5	▼19.2
Green	Geoff Shanks	685	24.9	▲4.8
Liberal Democrats	Michael Wang	598	21.7	▲16.1
Reform	Gary Farmer	258	9.4	N/A
Conservative	Tony Meadows	129	4.7	▼8.4
Democratic Liberation Party	Georgia McKinley-Fitch	93	3.4	N/A
TUSC	David Maple	91	3.3	N/A
Independent	Keith Jago	7	0.3	N/A
Majority		209		
Turnout				
Labour hold		Swing		

Queen's Park by-election 18 September 2025 (resignation of Tristram Burden)
Party	Candidate	Votes	%	±%
Green	Marina Lademacher	1,133	48.4	▲20.0
Labour	Simon Charleton	729	31.1	▼15.0
Reform	John Shepherd	237	10.1	N/A
Liberal Democrats	Rüdi Dikty-Daudiyan	98	4.2	▲1.8
Conservative	Sunny Choudhury	82	3.5	▲2.7
Independent	Adrian Hart	64	2.7	▼13.9
Majority		404	17.3	
Turnout		2,343	33.3	
Green gain from Labour		Swing		

Goldsmid by-election 25 June 2026 (resignation of Jackie O'Quinn)
Party	Candidate	Votes	%	±%
Green	Nadia Barton Ahmad	2,037	49.0	▲20.1
Labour	Philip Berman	1,357	32.7	▼18.4
Reform	Luke Willmoth	304	7.3	N/A
Liberal Democrats	Kim Leyland-Walker	314	5.2	▼2.0
Conservative	Louis Bird	210	5.1	▼5.4
TUSC	Glenn Kelly	31	0.7	N/A
Majority		680	17.3	
Turnout		4,153		
Green gain from Labour		Swing		

Queen's Park by-election 24 September 2026 (resignation of Milla Gauge)
Party	Candidate	Votes	%	±%
Green	Mark Strong	1,139	50.1	▲21.6
Labour	Steve Gladwin	802	35.3	▼10.8
Reform	John Shepherd	160	7.0	N/A
Conservative	Stefan Speckesser	97	4.3	▼1.9
Liberal Democrats	Rüdi Dikty-Daudiyan	74	3.3	▲0.8
Majority		337	14.8	
Turnout		2,272		
Green gain from Labour		Swing		
