= Pat Mountain (politician) =

British politician

Deputy Leader of the UK Independence Party
- In office 4 July 2020 – 12 September 2020
- Leader: Freddy Vachha
- Preceded by: Mike Hookem
- Succeeded by: Rebecca Jane

Acting Leader of the UK Independence Party
- In office 16 November 2019 – 28 April 2020
- Preceded by: Richard Braine
- Succeeded by: Freddy Vachha

Personal details
- Born: Patricia Ann Mountain; December 1946 (age 79)
- Party: UK Independence Party (2013-2024)

Patricia Ann Mountain (born December 1946) is a British politician who served as the interim leader of the UK Independence Party (UKIP) from 2019 to 2020. Mountain also served as the deputy leader of UKIP from July to September 2020.

== Career ==
Mountain was one of 10 UKIP candidates who stood for the South East England constituency in the 2019 European Parliament election in the United Kingdom, which also included Piers Wauchope, another interim leader; none of them was elected. Mountain has also stood for Brighton and Hove City Council three times: as the sole UKIP candidate in the 11 July 2013 by-election at the Hanover and Elm Grove ward, in 2015 at the Hangleton and Knoll ward, and in 2019 for the North Portslade ward; she did not win in any of them. Mountain stood in the by-election in Wish ward on 8 December 2022. She came last place with 34 votes, and UKIP's vote share was halved in the ward.

Mountain had retired by April 2019, and was a member of the National Executive Committee when she was appointed interim leader on 16 November 2019 to succeed Richard Braine. Mountain was the acting leader of UKIP during the 2019 United Kingdom general election, where none of the party's 44 candidates was elected to the House of Commons.

On 2 December 2019, Mountain appeared on Sky News for an interview with journalist Adam Boulton; it lasted for eight minutes and was described by the Evening Standard as a "car crash" and by The Independent as "the outstanding TV interview of the year... It wasn’t so much of a car crash as a spectacular, Evel Knievel-style nose-dive into a canyon". Some people noted a resemblance to Mountain and the title character of the comedy series Catherine Tate's Nan.

Her term as acting leader was due to expire on 31 January 2020. However, due to the fact that no leadership election had taken place by then, she continued in the role until April. It was later confirmed in June 2020 that Freddy Vachha was the new leader of UKIP.

Mountain was appointed as deputy leader of UKIP in July 2020, but had left the role by September 2020.

Mountain was the third-placed UKIP candidate on the South Scotland list at the 2021 Scottish Parliament election. None of the UKIP candidates was elected, with the party attracting 0.2% of all list votes in the region.

In July 2024, Searchlight reported that Mountain had been removed from UKIP's website as party director, alongside her position as immigration spokesperson and NEC member. She remained a director of UKIP Ltd, the registered company which runs the party. Days later, however, she had resigned from the role, and reportedly the party altogether, following other senior members said to be unhappy with UKIP's leadership.
