= Withdean (ward) =

Ward of Brighton and Hove

- Former ward Brighton & Hove City Council
- Boundary of Withdean in Brighton and Hove from 2003.
- Population: 14,721 (2021)

2003–2023
- Replaced by: Preston Park

Withdean was an electoral ward in Brighton, England. The population of the ward at the 2021 census was 14,721. It was part of the parliamentary constituency of Brighton Pavilion.

Following a review of boundaries, the ward was abolished and became part of the ward of Preston Park for the 2023 election.
