= Westbourne (Brighton and Hove ward) =

Ward of Brighton and Hove

- Former ward Brighton & Hove City Council
- Boundary of Westbourne in Brighton and Hove from 2003.
- Population: 9,785 (2021)

1996–2023
- Replaced by: Westbourne & Poets' Corner; Wish

Westbourne was an electoral ward in Hove, England. The population of the ward at the 2021 census was 9,785. It was part of the parliamentary constituency of Hove and Portslade.

Following a review of boundaries, the ward was abolished and became part of the wards of Westbourne & Poets' Corner and Wish for the 2023 election.
