= Hove Park (ward) =

Ward of Brighton and Hove

- Former ward Brighton & Hove City Council
- Boundary of Hove Park in Brighton and Hove from 2003.
- Population: 11,072 (2021)

1996–2023
- Replaced by: Westdene & Hove Park

Hove Park (known as Stanford until 2007) was an electoral ward in Hove, England. The population of the ward at the 2021 census was 11,072. It was part of the parliamentary constituency of Hove and Portslade.

Following a review of boundaries, the ward was abolished and became part of the ward of Westdene & Hove Park for the 2023 election.
