= Hollingdean & Stanmer =

Ward of Brighton and Hove

- Former ward Brighton & Hove City Council
- Boundary of Hollingdean & Stanmer in Brighton and Hove from 2003.
- Population: 16,878 (2021)

2003–2023
- Replaced by: Coldean & Stanmer; Hollingdean & Fiveways

Hollingdean & Stanmer (known as Hollingbury & Stanmer until 2007) was an electoral ward in Brighton, England. The population of the ward at the 2021 census was 16,878. It was part of the parliamentary constituencies of Brighton Kemptown and Peacehaven and Brighton Pavilion.

Following a review of boundaries, the ward was abolished and became part of the wards of Coldean & Stanmer and Hollingdean & Fiveways for the 2023 election.
