= Regency (ward) =

Ward of Brighton and Hove

- ward Brighton & Hove City Council
- Boundary of Regency in Brighton and Hove from 2003.
- Population: 9,953 (2021)

Current ward
- Created: 1996
- Councillor: Alison Thomson (Labour)
- Councillor: Chloe Goldsmith (Green)

Regency is an electoral ward in Hove, England. The population of the ward at the 2021 census was 9,953. The ward elects two councillors to Brighton and Hove City Council; as of 28 February 2025, they are Alison Thomson of the Labour Party and Chloe Goldsmith of the Green Party. The ward is part of the parliamentary constituency of Hove and Portslade.
