= Queen's Park (Brighton ward) =

Ward of Brighton and Hove

- ward Brighton & Hove City Council
- Boundary of Queen's Park in Brighton and Hove from 2003.
- Population: 15,646 (2021)

Current ward
- Created: 2003
- Councillor: Milla Gauge (Labour)
- Councillor: Marina Lademacher (Green)

Queen's Park is an electoral ward in Brighton, England. The population of the ward at the 2021 census was 15,646. The ward elects two councillors to Brighton & Hove City Council. Until July 2025, they were Milla Gauge and Tristram Burden, both of the Labour Party. However Tristram Burden resigned on 29 July 2025 triggering a by-election on 18 September 2025. This was won by Marina Lademacher of the Green Party.

Milla Gauge resigned in August 2026, leading to a third by-election in the ward on 24 September 2026, won by Mark Strong also of the Green Party.

This meant that both Labour councillors elected in the full 2023 council election quit before completing their terms, following the stepping down of Chandni Mistry in March 2024 after an investigation into claims that she was not a resident of Brighton & Hove and hence not legally qualified to stand.

The ward is part of the parliamentary constituency of Brighton Kemptown and Peacehaven.

The area lies to the east of the centre of Brighton, north of Kemptown and south-east of Hanover. It is largely made up of Victorian terraced houses, with a smaller number of detached and semi-detached houses, and includes Queen's Park public park. Around a third of the properties in the ward are flats, including both low-rise blocks of modern flats and older high-rise council blocks.

St Luke's Church, an Anglican church built in the Early English style, lies at the centre of the area. Designed by Sir Arthur Blomfield and constructed between 1881 and 1885, the large flint-walled building has an unusual layout of bays in the north and south aisles of its nave; Nikolaus Pevsner described this as "curious" and a "disturbing motif". The church was listed at Grade II in 1999.
