= Rottingdean Coastal =

Ward of Brighton and Hove

- Former ward Brighton & Hove City Council
- Boundary of Rottingdean Coastal in Brighton and Hove from 2003.
- Population: 14,293 (2021)

2003–2023
- Replaced by: Rottingdean & West Saltdean; Whitehawk & Marina

Rottingdean Coastal was an electoral ward in Brighton, England. The population of the ward at the 2021 census was 14,293. It was part of the parliamentary constituency of Brighton Kemptown and Peacehaven.

Following a review of boundaries, the ward was abolished and became part of the wards of Rottingdean & West Saltdean and Whitehawk & Marina for the 2023 election.
