= Central Hove =

Ward of Brighton and Hove

- ward Brighton & Hove City Council
- Boundary of Central Hove in Brighton and Hove from 2003.
- Population: 9,319 (2021)

Current ward
- Created: 2003
- Councillor: Emma Daniel (Labour)
- Councillor: Joy Robinson (Labour)

Central Hove is an electoral ward in Hove, England. The population of the ward at the 2021 census was 9,319. The ward elects two councillors to Brighton and Hove City Council; as of 28 February 2025, they are Emma Daniel and Joy Robinson, both of the Labour Party. The ward is part of the parliamentary constituency of Hove and Portslade.
