= Brunswick & Adelaide =

Ward of Brighton and Hove

- ward Brighton & Hove City Council
- Boundary of Brunswick & Adelaide in Brighton and Hove from 2003.
- Population: 9,916 (2021)

Current ward
- Created: 1996
- Councillor: Andrei Czolak (Labour)
- Councillor: Ollie Sykes (Green)

Brunswick & Adelaide is an electoral ward in Hove, England. The population of the ward at the 2021 census was 9,916. The ward elects two councillors to Brighton and Hove City Council; as of 28 February 2025, they are Andrei Czolak of the Labour Party and Ollie Sykes of the Green Party. The ward is part of the parliamentary constituency of Hove and Portslade.
