= Woodingdean (ward) =

Ward of Brighton and Hove

- ward Brighton & Hove City Council
- Boundary of Woodingdean in Brighton and Hove from 2003.
- Population: 9,773 (2021)

Current ward
- Created: 1996
- Councillor: Jacob Allen (Labour)
- Councillor: Jacqui Simon (Labour)

Woodingdean is an electoral ward in Woodingdean, England. The population of the ward at the 2021 census was 9,773. The ward elects two councillors to Brighton and Hove City Council; as of 28 February 2025, they are Jacob Allen and Jacqui Simon of the Labour Party. The ward is part of the parliamentary constituency of Brighton Kemptown and Peacehaven.
