= Hanover & Elm Grove =

Ward of Brighton and Hove

- ward Brighton & Hove City Council
- Boundary of Hanover & Elm Grove in Brighton and Hove from 2003.
- Population: 16,014 (2021)

Current ward
- Created: 2003
- Councillor: Ty Galvin (Labour)
- Councillor: Tim Rowkins (Labour)
- Councillor: Maureen Winder (Labour)

Hanover & Elm Grove is an electoral ward in Brighton, England. The population of the ward at the 2021 census was 16,014. The ward elects three councillors to Brighton and Hove City Council; as of 28 February 2025, they are Ty Galvin, Tim Rowkins and Maureen Winder, all of the Labour Party. The ward is part of the parliamentary constituencies of Brighton Kemptown and Peacehaven and Brighton Pavilion.
