= St. Peter's & North Laine =

Ward of Brighton and Hove

- Former ward Brighton & Hove City Council
- Boundary of St. Peter's & North Laine in Brighton and Hove from 2003.
- Population: 17,669 (2021)

2003–2023
- Replaced by: Round Hill; West Hill & North Laine

St. Peter's & North Laine was an electoral ward in Brighton, England. The population of the ward at the 2021 census was 17,669. It was part of the parliamentary constituency of Brighton Pavilion.

Following a review of boundaries, the ward was abolished and became part of the wards of Round Hill and West Hill & North Laine for the 2023 election.
