= Hangleton & Knoll (ward) =

Ward of Brighton and Hove

- ward Brighton & Hove City Council
- Boundary of Hangleton & Knoll in Brighton and Hove from 2003.
- Population: 15,227 (2021)

Current ward
- Created: 2003
- Councillor: Amanda Grimshaw (Labour)
- Councillor: Faiza Baghoth (Labour)
- Councillor: John Hewitt (Labour)

Hangleton & Knoll is an electoral ward in Hove, England. The population of the ward at the 2021 census was 15,227. The ward elects three councillors to Brighton and Hove City Council; as of 28 February 2025, they are Amanda Grimshaw, Faiza Baghoth and John Hewitt, all of the Labour Party. The ward is part of the parliamentary constituency of Hove and Portslade.
