= Moulsecoomb & Bevendean =

Ward of Brighton and Hove

- ward Brighton & Hove City Council
- Boundary of Moulsecoomb & Bevendean in Brighton and Hove from 2003.
- Population: 16,887 (2021)

Current ward
- Created: 2003
- Councillor: Amanda Evans (Labour)
- Councillor: Ty Goddard (Labour)
- Councillor: Jacob Taylor (Labour)

Moulsecoomb & Bevendean is an electoral ward in Brighton, England. The population of the ward at the 2021 census was 16,887. The ward elects three councillors to Brighton and Hove City Council; as of 28 February 2025, they are Amanda Evans, Ty Goddard and Jacob Taylor, all of the Labour Party. The ward is part of the parliamentary constituency of Brighton Kemptown and Peacehaven.
