= Goldsmid (ward) =

Ward of Brighton and Hove

- ward Brighton & Hove City Council
- Boundary of Goldsmid in Brighton and Hove from 2003.
- Population: 15,857 (2021)

Current ward
- Created: 1996
- Councillor: Nadia Barton Ahmad (Green)
- Councillor: Trevor Muten (Labour)
- Councillor: Birgit Miller (Labour)

Goldsmid is an electoral ward in Hove, England. The population of the ward at the 2021 census was 15,857. The ward elects three councillors to Brighton and Hove City Council. Following a by-election on 25 June 2026 triggered by the resignation of Councillor Jackie O'Quinn, Nadia Barton Ahmad of the Green Party was elected with 49.0% of the vote. As of June 2026, the other two council seats are held by Trevor Muten and Birgit Miller, both representing the Labour Party. The ward is part of the parliamentary constituency of Hove and Portslade.
