= South Portslade =

Ward of Brighton and Hove

- ward Brighton & Hove City Council
- Boundary of South Portslade in Brighton and Hove from 2003.
- Population: 9,895 (2021)

Current ward
- Created: 1996
- Councillor: Josh Guilmant (Labour)
- Councillor: Alan Robins (Labour)

South Portslade is an electoral ward in Portslade, England. The population of the ward at the 2021 census was 9,895. The ward elects two councillors to Brighton and Hove City Council; as of 28 February 2025, they are Josh Guilmant and Alan Robins, both of the Labour Party. The ward is part of the parliamentary constituency of Hove and Portslade.
