= North Portslade =

Ward of Brighton and Hove

- ward Brighton & Hove City Council
- Boundary of North Portslade in Brighton and Hove from 2003.
- Population: 10,129 (2021)

Current ward
- Created: 1996
- Councillor: Peter Atkinson (Independent)
- Councillor: Lucy Helliwell (Labour)

North Portslade is an electoral ward in Portslade, England. The population of the ward at the 2021 census was 10,129. The ward elects two councillors to Brighton and Hove City Council; as of 28 February 2025, they are Peter Atkinson of no party and Lucy Helliwell of the Labour Party. The ward is part of the parliamentary constituency of Hove and Portslade.
