= Wish (ward) =

Ward of Brighton and Hove

- ward Brighton & Hove City Council
- Boundary of Wish in Brighton and Hove from 2003.
- Population: 10,333 (2021)

Current ward
- Created: 1996
- Councillor: Bella Sankey (Labour)
- Councillor: Paul Nann (Labour)

Wish is an electoral ward in Hove, England. The population of the ward at the 2021 census was 10,333. The ward elects two councillors to Brighton and Hove City Council; as of 28 February 2025, they are Bella Sankey and Paul Nann of the Labour Party. The ward is part of the parliamentary constituency of Hove and Portslade.
