= 2011 Brighton and Hove City Council election =

2011 UK local government election

- 5 May 2011

All 54 council seats 28 seats needed for a majority
	First party	Second party	Third party
Party	Green	Conservative	Labour
Last election	13 seats, 20.7%	26 seats, 34.6%	13 seats, 24.7%
Seats won	23	18	13
Seat change	▲10	▼8	Steady
Popular vote	73,832	64,837	71,738
Percentage	32.8%	28.8%	31.7%
Swing	▲12.1%	▼6.1%	▲7.0%
- Map of results of 2011 election
Previous Largest Party before election
Conservative
Subsequent Largest Party
Green

Elections to Brighton and Hove City Council were held on 5 May 2011, in line with other local elections in the United Kingdom. The whole council, a unitary authority, was up for election with 54 councillors elected from 21 wards.

The Green Party made significant gains, overtaking the Conservatives to become the largest party with 23 seats, the largest Green group on any council. The Greens gained seats at the expense of all three other parties, taking the only ward previously in Liberal Democrat hands. The Conservatives lost not only to the Greens but to Labour Co-op candidates in different parts of the city.

The Greens, Conservatives and Labour Co-op fielded candidates for every seat on the council. The Liberal Democrats contested all but one ward. The UK Independence Party, European Citizens Party and Trade Unionists and Socialists Against Cuts also fielded candidates. In addition, there were six independents standing, including re-standing councillor and former Liberal Democrat David Watkins.

Following the election the Labour Co-operative group rejected the possibility of forming a coalition with the Green Party, who then went on to form the first ever Green council administration in the UK, as a minority administration.

Following the election, the composition of the council was as follows:

Green: 23 Conservative: 18 Labour: 13

== Changes between 2007 and 2011 elections ==
Since the 2007 Council Election there were a number of changes to the make up of the council:

In the Regency, Goldsmid and St. Peter's & North Laine wards there were by-elections, all of which were won or held by the Green Party. In Brunswick and Adelaide one councillor, David Watkins resigned from the Liberal Democrats and stood as an independent in this election. Jayne Bennett, who was elected as an Independent in the 2007 election in the Stanford/Hove Park ward, rejoined the Conservative Party (which she had left in 2002), and stood as such in 2011.

Two ward names were changed during the four-year period: Hollingbury and Stanmer became Hollingdean and Stanmer, and Stanford ward was renamed Hove Park, using the council's powers under the Local Government and Public Involvement in Health Act 2007.

== Results of election ==
Brighton and Hove election result 2011
Party	Seats	Gains	Losses	Net gain/loss	Seats %	Votes %	Votes	+/−
Green	23	10	0	+10	42.59	32.75	73,832	+12.06
Conservative	18	0	8	-8	33.33	28.76	64,837	-6.08
Labour Co-op	13	5	5	0	24.07	31.82	71,738	+7.00
Liberal Democrats	0	0	1	-1	0	5.47	12,326	-5.09
Independent	0	0	1	-1	0	0.78	1,765	-4.54
UKIP	0	0	0	0	0	0.41	918	+0.06
TUSC	0	0	0	0	0	0.33	758	N/A
European Citizens Party	0	0	0	0	0	0.03	76	N/A

== Ward breakdown ==
=== Brunswick and Adelaide ===
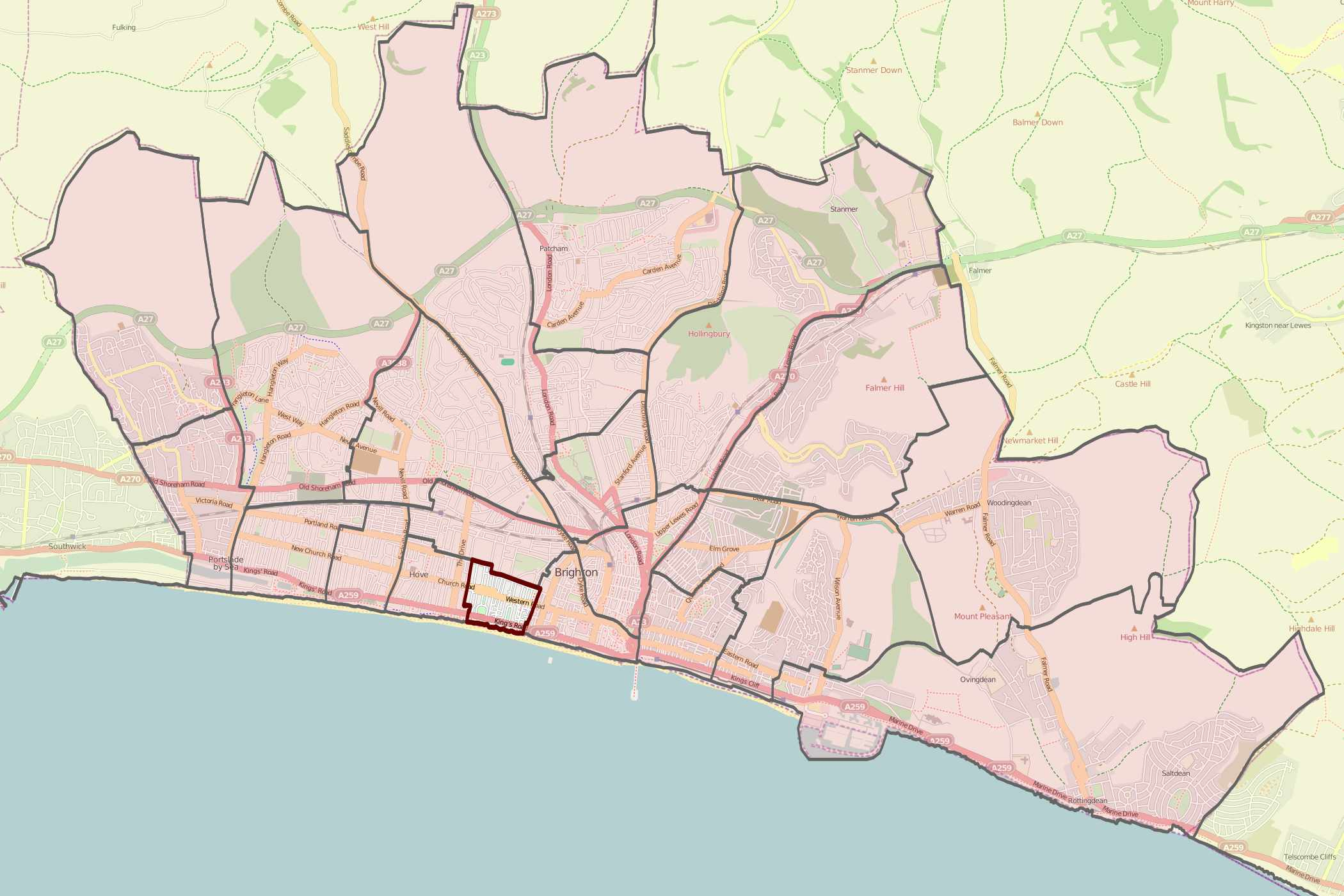
Brunswick and Adelaide highlighted

Brunswick and Adelaide (2 seats)
Party	Candidate	Votes	%	±%
Green	Phélim Mac Cafferty	1,140	20.07	+8.21
Green	Ollie Sykes	1,135	19.30	+8.69
Liberal Democrats	Paul Elgood	919	15.63	−7.55
Labour Co-op	Ray Barnes	622	10.58	+3.59
Labour Co-op	Rob Macey	611	10.34	+3.87
Liberal Democrats	Brian Stone	502	8.54	−9.40
Conservative	Richard Latham	395	6.72	−2.34
Conservative	Adam Campbell	394	6.70	−2.08
Independent	David Watkins	163	2.77	−15.17
UKIP	Mark Cribb	69	1.17	N/A
Turnout		3,138	41.8	+13.1
Green gain from Liberal Democrats		Swing	+15.76	
Green gain from Independent		Swing	+23.86	

=== Central Hove ===
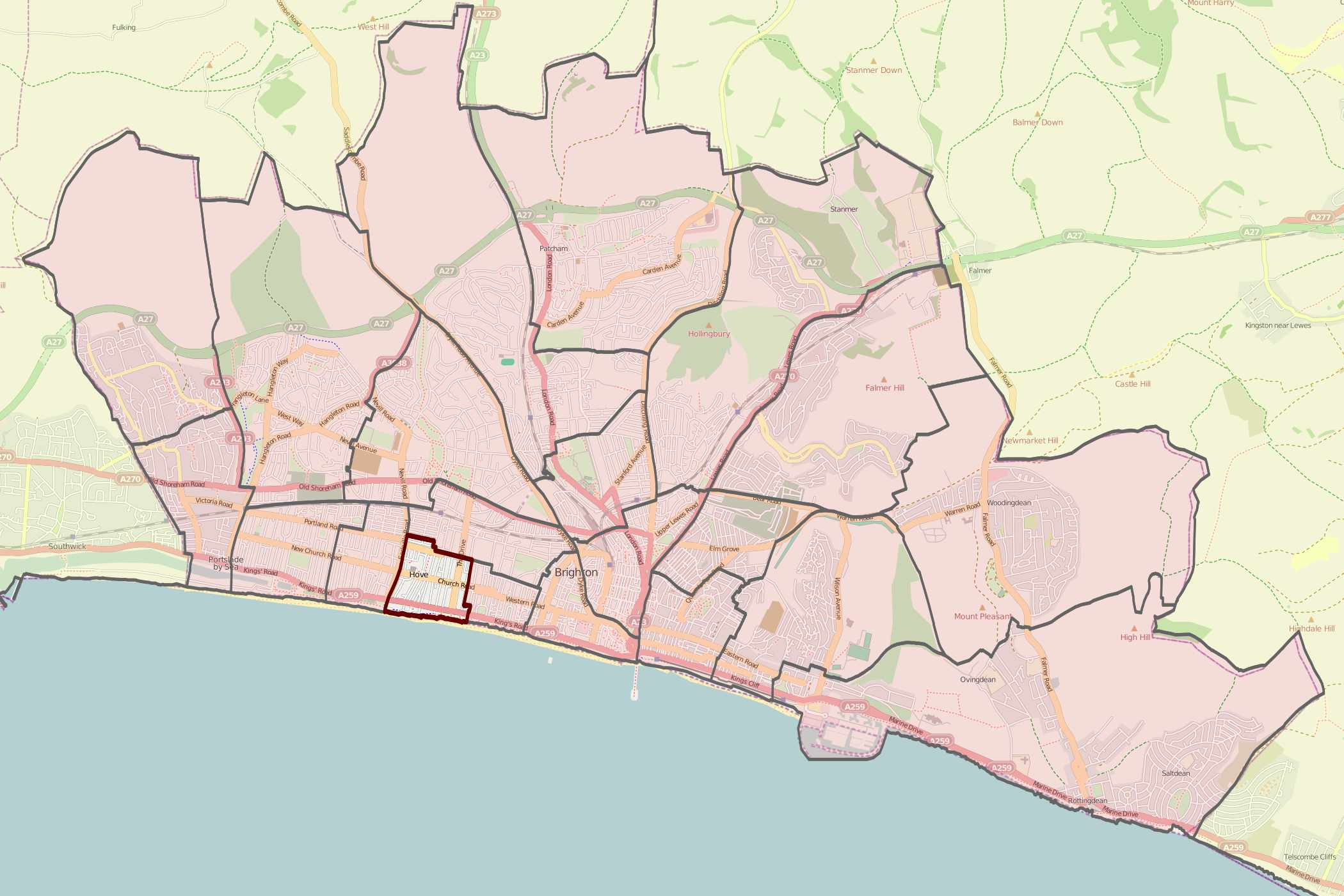
Central Hove highlighted

Central Hove (2 seats)
Party	Candidate	Votes	%	±%
Green	Chris Hawtree	1,006	17.73	+8.81
Conservative	Andrew Wealls	972	17.13	−3.35
Conservative	Jan Young	932	16.43	−2.71
Green	Anthea Ballam	819	14.44	+7.37
Labour Co-op	Celia Barlow	704	12.41	+5.68
Labour Co-op	Caroline Penn	594	10.47	+4.01
Liberal Democrats	Mark Collins	347	6.12	−8.58
Liberal Democrats	Rebecca Taylor	299	5.27	−8.90
Turnout		2988	42.7	+8.7
Green gain from Conservative		Swing	+13.51	
Conservative hold		Swing	-3.09	

=== East Brighton ===
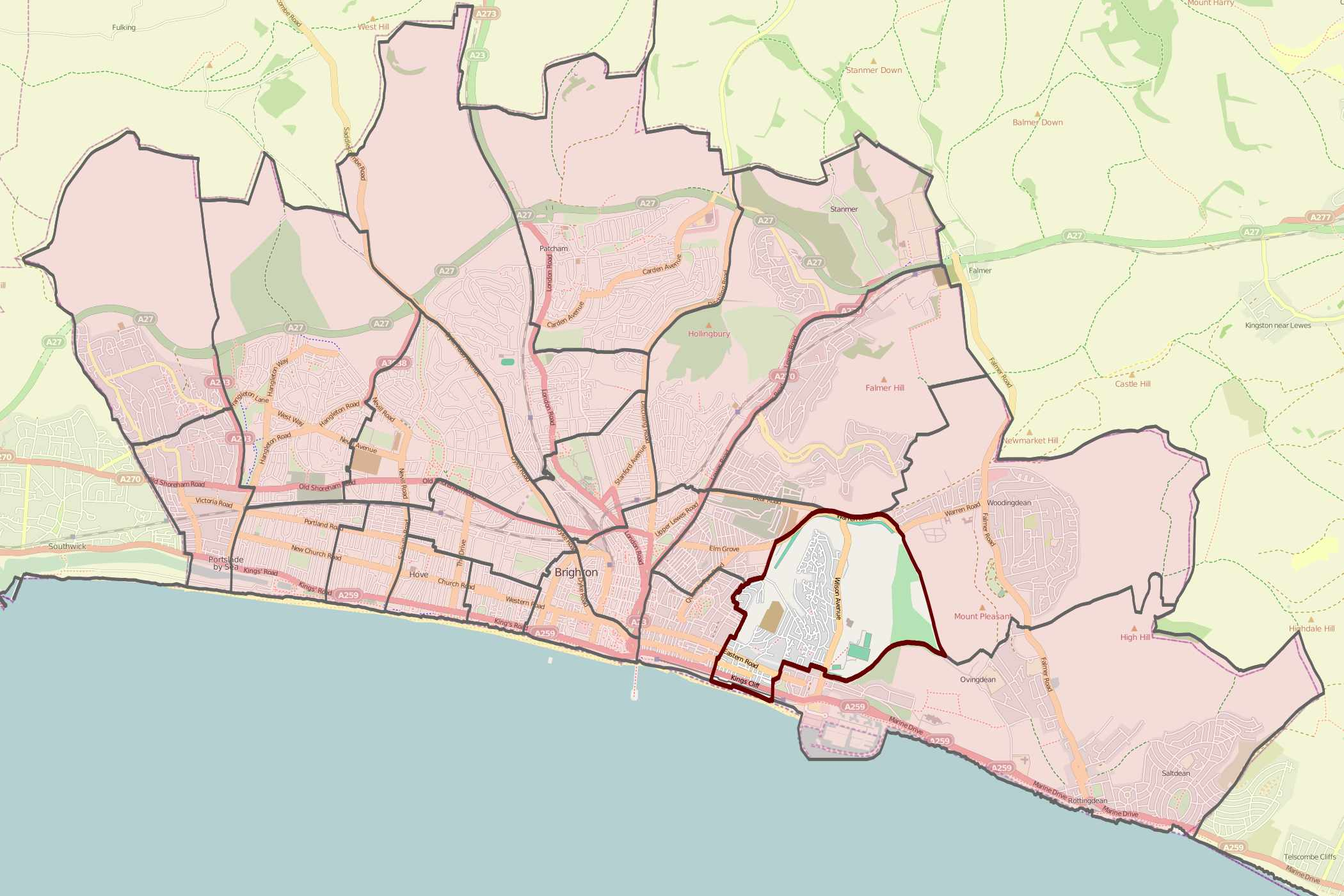
East Brighton highlighted

East Brighton (3 seats)
Party	Candidate	Votes	%	±%
Labour Co-op	Gill Mitchell	2,059	18.41	+2.63
Labour Co-op	Warren Morgan	1,862	16.65	+2.92
Labour Co-op	Craig Turton	1,616	14.45	+2.09
Green	Alison Ghanimi	955	8.54	+2.46
Conservative	Peter Booth	940	8.40	−1.40
Conservative	Chris Sandland	826	7.38	−2.39
Green	Lianna Etkind	815	7.29	+2.71
Conservative	Kelvin Poplett	803	7.18	−1.94
Green	Pip Tindall	627	5.61	+1.25
Liberal Democrats	Paul Chandler	323	2.89	−1.04
Liberal Democrats	Bruce Neave	218	1.95	−1.97
Liberal Democrats	Bill North	142	1.27	−2.42
Turnout		4,045	39.5	+4.1
Labour Co-op hold		Swing	+0.07	
Labour Co-op hold		Swing	+4.29	
Labour Co-op hold		Swing	+3.82	

=== Goldsmid ===
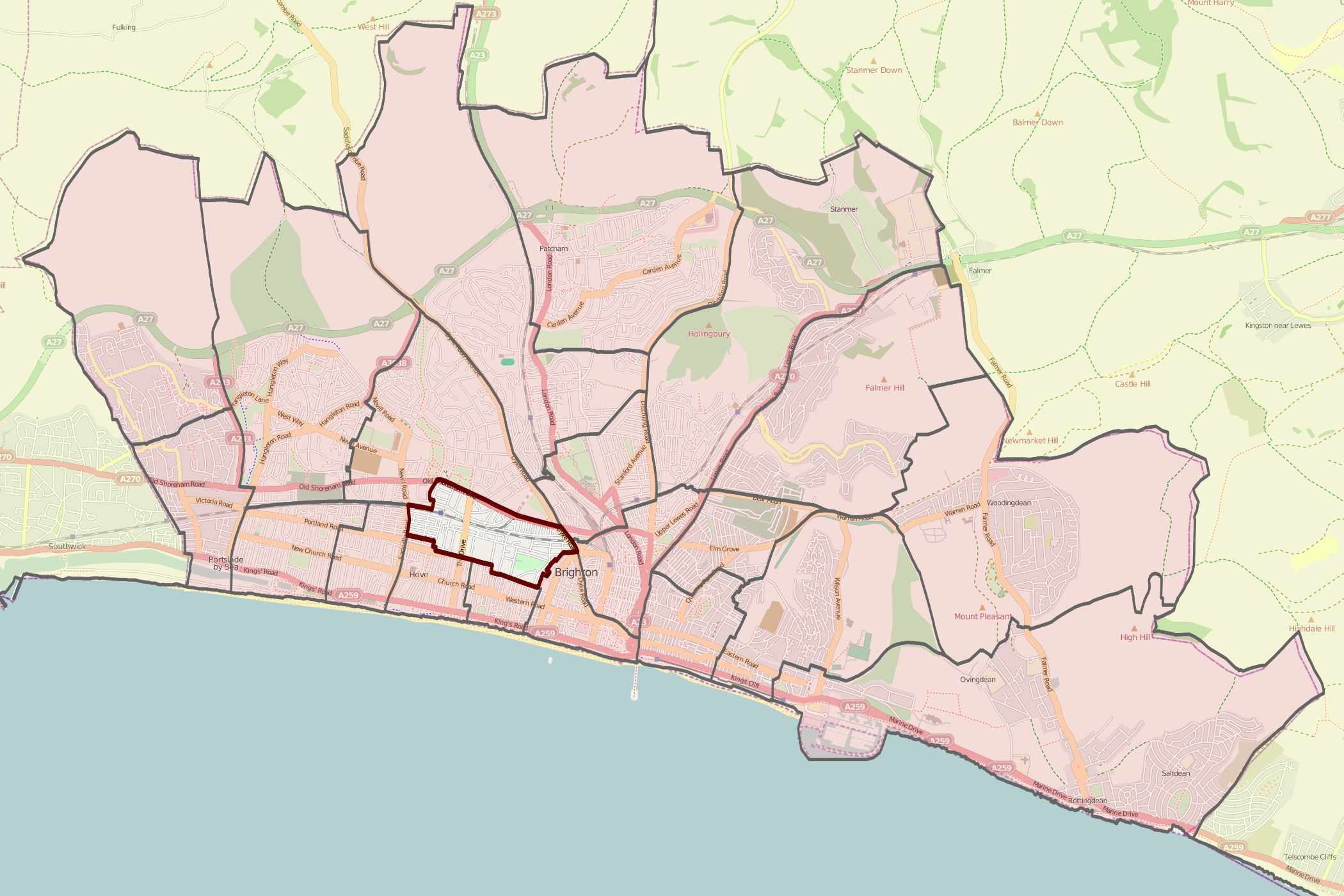
Goldsmid highlighted

Goldsmid (3 seats)
Party	Candidate	Votes	%	±%
Green	Ruth Buckley	2,264	14.19	+7.51
Green	Alexandra Phillips	2,204	13.82	+7.72
Green	Rob Jarrett	1,898	11.90	+3.80
Labour Co-op	Melanie Davis	1,755	11.00	+1.13
Labour Co-op	Nigel Jenner	1,516	9.50	−0.13
Conservative	Adam Love	1,428	8.96	−1.71
Conservative	Rob Buckwell	1,420	8.90	−1.03
Conservative	Debra Livingstone-Wade	1,333	8.25	−1.29
Labour Co-op	Lis Telcs	1,271	7.97	−0.84
Liberal Democrats	Andrew Malling	312	1.96	−2.92
Liberal Democrats	Gloria Parks	281	1.76	−4.01
Liberal Democrats	John Aloy	269	1.69	−2.37
Turnout		5,566	56.6	+19.1
Green gain from Conservative		Swing	+9.80	
Green hold		Swing	+8.75	
Green gain from Labour Co-op		Swing	+2.67	

=== Hangleton and Knoll ===
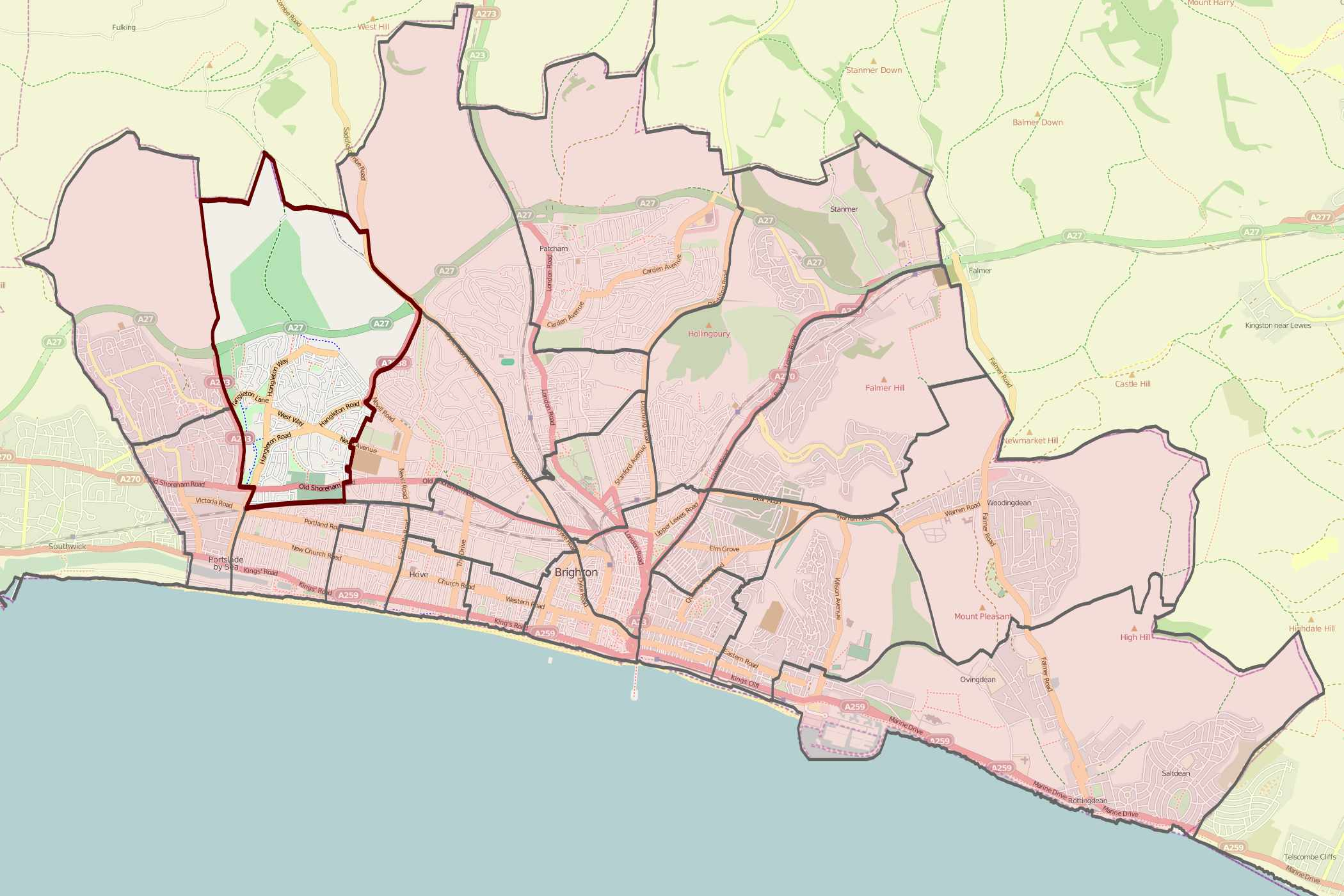
Hangleton and Knoll highlighted

Hangleton and Knoll (3 seats)
Party	Candidate	Votes	%	±%
Conservative	Dawn Barnett	2,412	16.73	−2.00
Labour Co-op	Brian Fitch	2,139	14.84	+1.98
Conservative	Tony Janio	2,056	14.26	−1.54
Conservative	Michael Ireland	1,884	13.07	−2.58
Labour Co-op	Dominic Ford	1,855	12.87	+2.17
Labour Co-op	Alun Jones	1,778	12.33	+1.67
Liberal Democrats	Jo Heard	688	4.77	+2.10
Green	Martin Ashby	492	3.41	+1.14
Green	Adele Bates	379	2.63	+0.83
Liberal Democrats	Lawrence Collins	326	2.26	+0.42
Green	Nic Compton	265	1.84	+0.07
Liberal Democrats	Dinah Staples	143	0.99	−0.41
Turnout		5,121	46.9	+1.3
Conservative hold		Swing	-4.17	
Labour Co-op gain from Conservative		Swing	+4.56	
Conservative hold		Swing	-3.06	

=== Hanover and Elm Grove ===
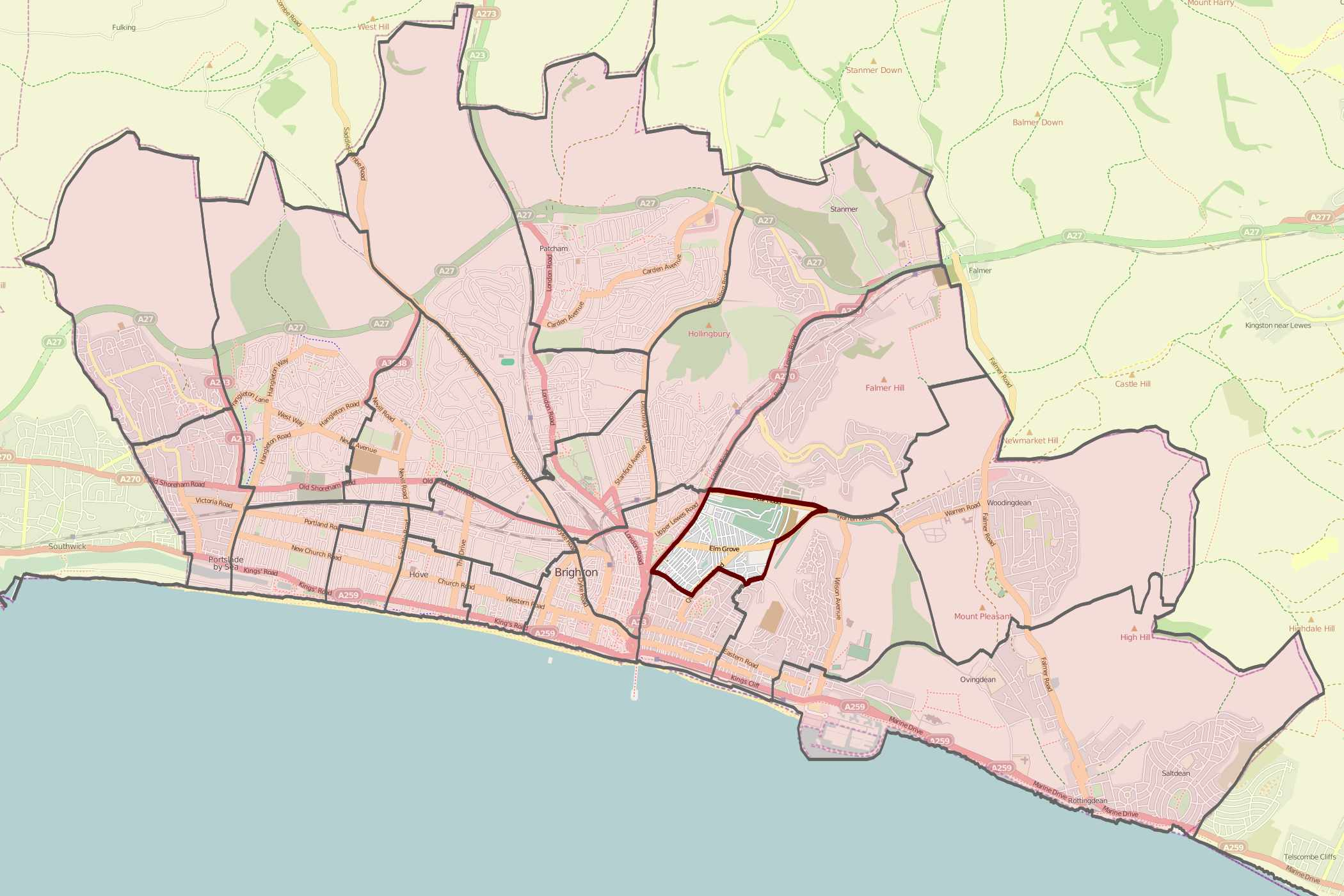
Hanover and Elm Grove highlighted

Hanover and Elm Grove (3 seats)
Party	Candidate	Votes	%	±%
Green	Bill Randall	2,861	18.84	+0.23
Green	Matt Follett	2,800	18.44	+0.51
Green	Liz Wakefield	2,576	16.97	+0.38
Labour Co-op	Leo Barraclough	1,662	10.95	+2.17
Labour Co-op	Tracey Hill	1,661	10.94	−0.33
Labour Co-op	David Speirs	1,606	10.58	+2.52
Conservative	Rosemary Faulkner	499	3.29	−0.82
Conservative	Roger McCabe	441	2.90	−1.01
Conservative	Karen Miles	434	2.86	−0.65
Liberal Democrats	Elliot Eke	189	1.24	−1.60
Liberal Democrats	Raymond Parker	159	1.05	−1.17
TUSC	John Redford	156	1.03	N/A
Liberal Democrats	Belkasim Gahran	140	0.92	−1.26
Turnout		5,411	46.7	+10.1
Green hold		Swing	+0.55	
Green hold		Swing	-1.65	
Green hold		Swing	-2.14	

=== Hollingdean and Stanmer ===
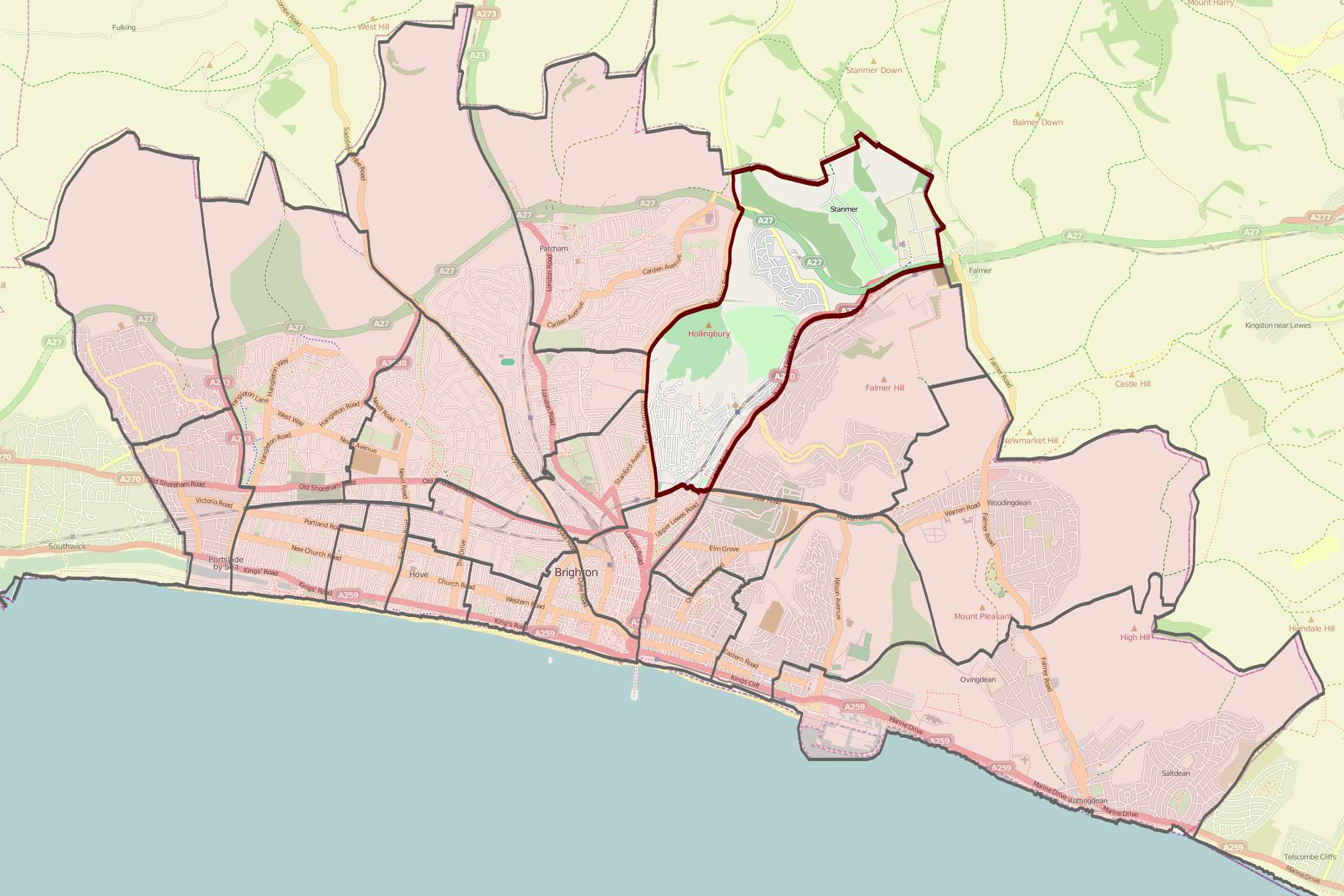
Hollingdean and Stanmer highlighted

Hollingdean and Stanmer (3 seats)
Party	Candidate	Votes	%	±%
Green	Sven Rufus	1,753	13.58	+5.78
Green	Christina Summers	1,748	13.55	+7.16
Labour Co-op	Jeane Lepper	1,681	13.03	−2.07
Labour Co-op	Pat Hawkes	1,557	12.07	+0.13
Green	Luke Walter	1,523	11.80	+6.95
Labour Co-op	Christine Simpson	1,511	11.71	−0.23
Conservative	Rachael Bates	767	5.94	−3.60
Conservative	Patrick Lowe	761	5.90	−3.57
Conservative	Rob Labs	732	5.67	−3.72
UKIP	Nigel Carter	166	1.29	N/A
Liberal Democrats	Oliver Eke	138	1.07	−3.27
Liberal Democrats	Emma Harrop	127	0.98	−2.27
TUSC	Tony Greenstein	126	0.98	−1.66
TUSC	Phil Clarke	120	0.93	N/A
Liberal Democrats	Lillian Harrop	105	0.81	−2.24
TUSC	Dave Hill	89	0.67	N/A
Turnout		4,662	39.7	+9.07
Green gain from Labour Co-op		Swing	+4.06	
Green gain from Labour Co-op		Swing	+4.39	
Labour Co-op hold		Swing	-4.33	

=== Hove Park ===
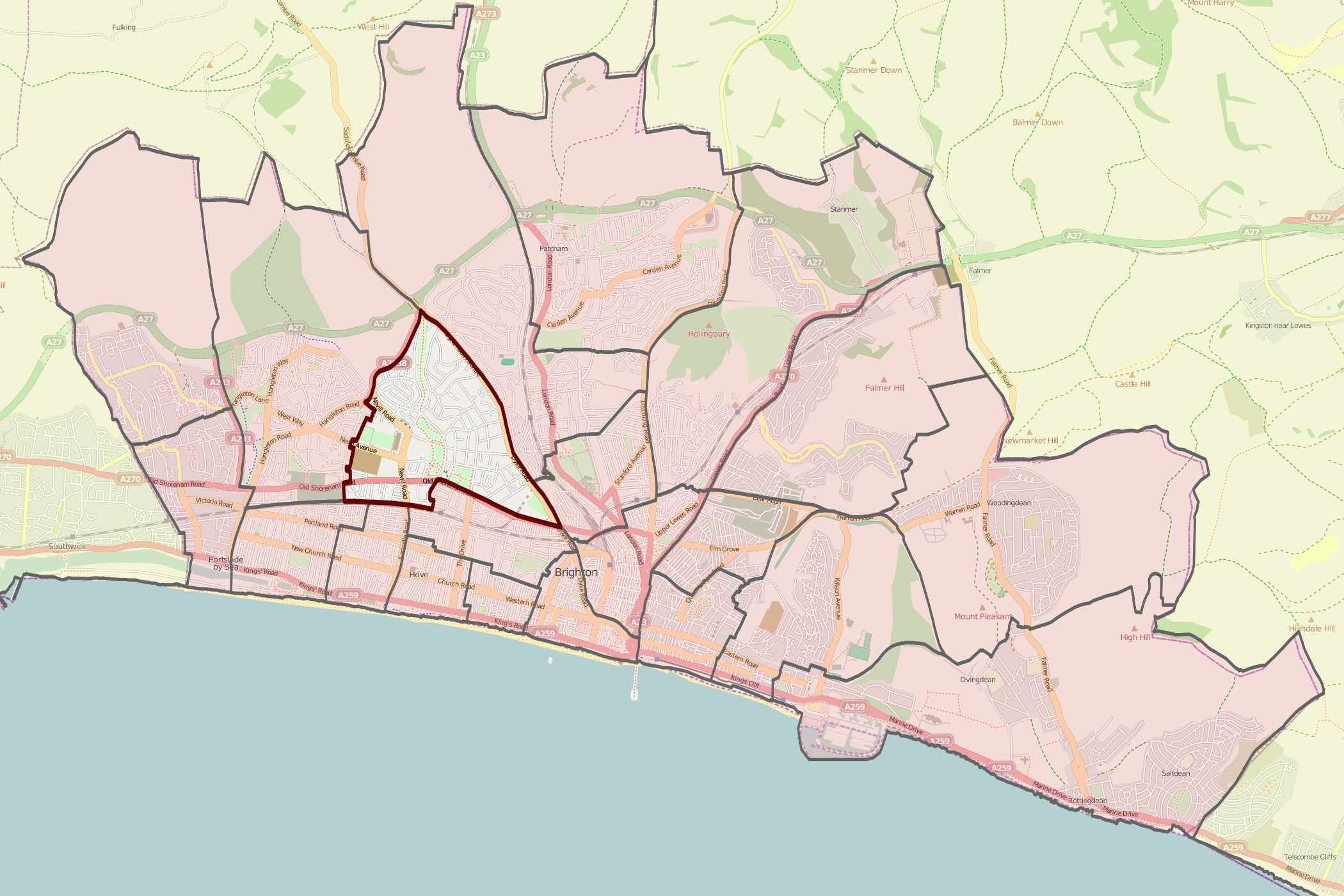
Hove Park highlighted

Hove Park (2 seats)
Party	Candidate	Votes	%	±%
Conservative	Jayne Bennett	2,557	35.01	+4.66
Conservative	Vanessa Brown	2,368	32.43	+0.63
Labour Co-op	John Cooper	661	9.05	+5.31
Labour Co-op	Bernie Katz	505	6.91	+3.75
Green	Gavin Graham	458	6.27	+2.20
Green	Jane Prisley	292	4.00	+2.15
Liberal Democrats	Anna Gerrard	198	2.71	−0.11
Liberal Democrats	Manrico Oliveri	158	2.16	+0.37
UKIP	Sasha Stephens	106	1.45	N/A
Turnout		3,771	46.9	−3.53
Conservative hold		Swing	+16.03	
Conservative hold		Swing	-2.21	

=== Moulsecoomb and Bevendean ===
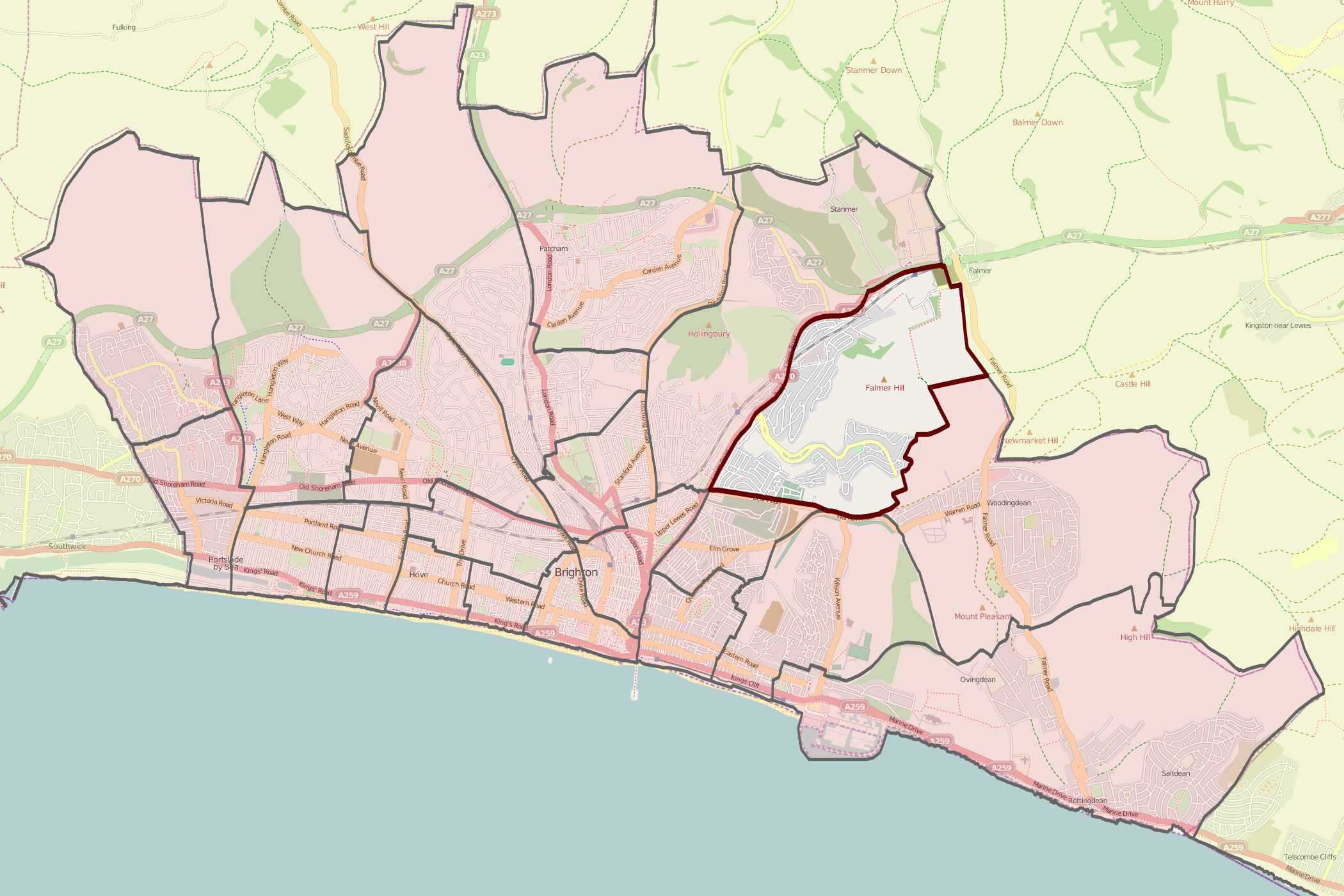
Moulsecoomb and Bevendean highlighted

Moulsecoomb and Bevendean (3 seats)
Party	Candidate	Votes	%	±%
Labour Co-op	Mo Marsh	1,721	15.98	+3.45
Labour Co-op	Leigh Farrow	1,666	15.47	+5.04
Labour Co-op	Anne Meadows	1,663	15.44	+2.92
Green	Allie Cannell	1,080	10.03	+1.27
Conservative	Maria Caulfield	1,048	9.73	−2.37
Conservative	Cath Slater	863	8.01	−4.08
Green	Kelly Dibbert	852	7.91	+3.52
Conservative	Ayas Fallon-Khan	838	7.78	−4.07
Green	Amelia Mills	772	7.17	+3.08
TUSC	Dave Bangs	267	2.48	−1.77
Turnout		3,868	31.8	+4.62
Labour Co-op hold		Swing	+5.52	
Labour Co-op gain from Conservative		Swing	+7.41	
Labour Co-op hold		Swing	+6.76	

=== North Portslade ===
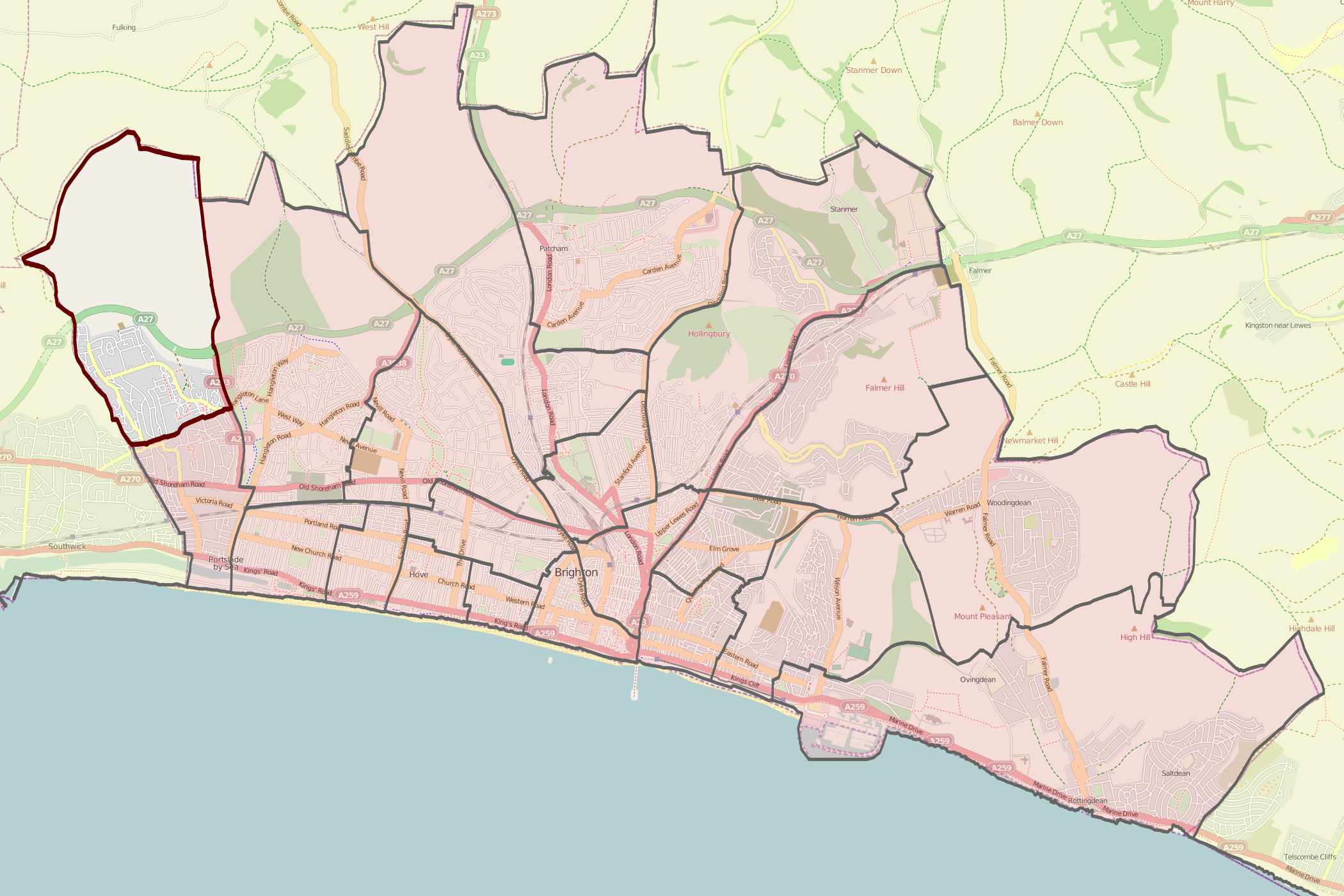
North Portslade highlighted

North Portslade (2 seats)
Party	Candidate	Votes	%	±%
Labour Co-op	Bob Carden	1,596	29.82	+7.07
Labour Co-op	Penny Gilbey	1,240	23.16	+3.62
Conservative	Trevor Alford	1,010	18.87	−2.70
Conservative	Kerry Underhill	639	11.94	−8.77
Green	Jacob Chapman	245	4.58	+1.01
UKIP	Maria McCallum	155	2.90	N/A
Green	Dave Walsh	130	2.43	−1.06
Liberal Democrats	Ali Haydor	126	2.35	−2.51
Liberal Democrats	Billie Lewis	106	1.98	−1.51
Independent	Theo Child	106	1.98	N/A
Turnout		3,030	39.6	+3.75
Labour Co-op hold		Swing	+15.84	
Labour Co-op gain from Conservative		Swing	+6.32	

=== Patcham ===
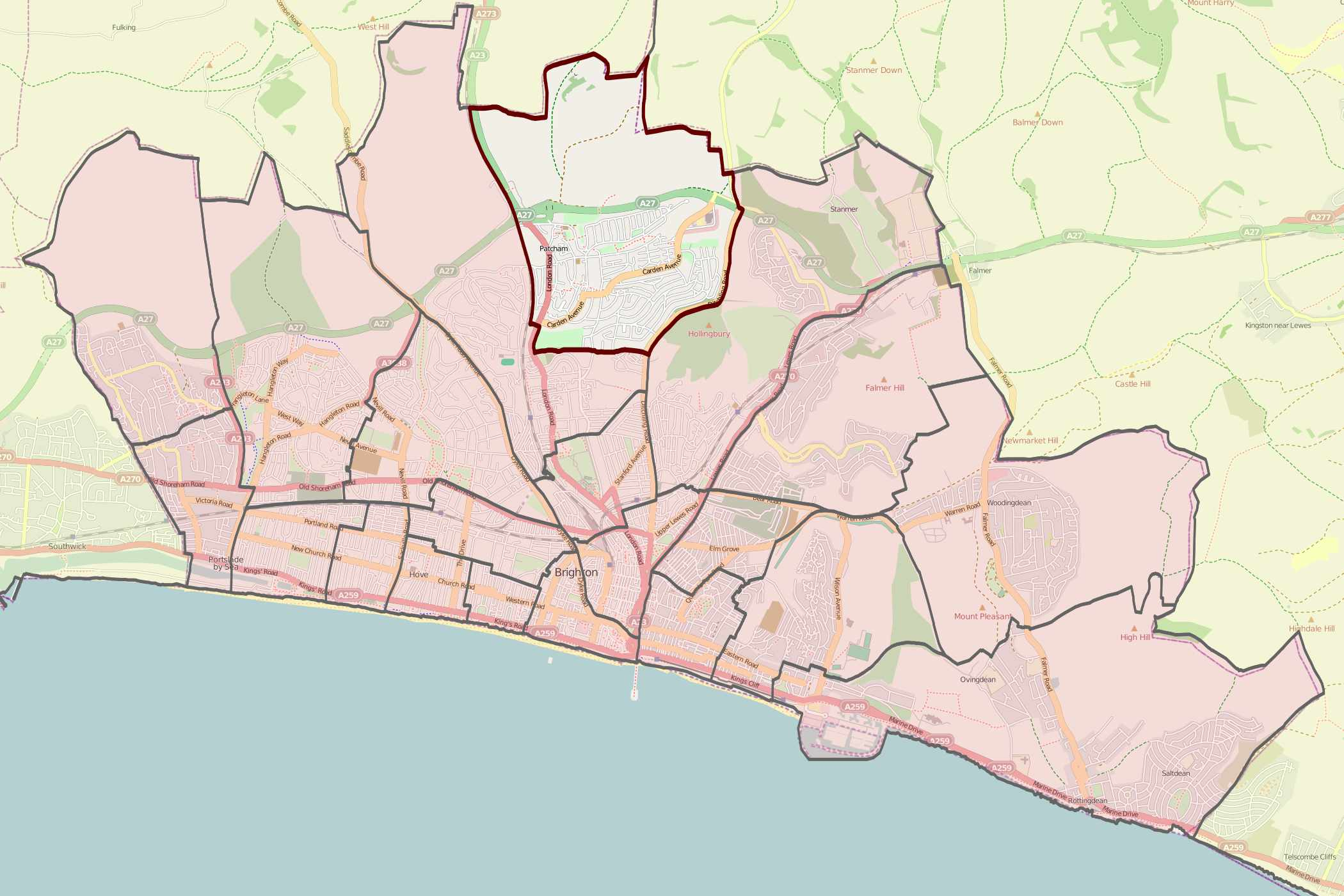
Patcham highlighted

Patcham (3 seats)
Party	Candidate	Votes	%	±%
Conservative	Brian Pidgeon	2,187	15.81	−4.96
Conservative	Carol Theobald	2,059	14.88	−5.53
Conservative	Geoffrey Theobald	2,042	14.76	−5.34
Green	Hugh Woodhouse	1,433	10.36	+7.00
Green	Geraldine Keenan	1,338	9.67	+4.79
Green	Linda McRae	1,274	9.91	+6.73
Labour Co-op	Christine Moody	1,151	8.32	+2.21
Labour Co-op	Jatin Patel	960	6.94	−0.07
Labour Co-op	Rosemary Collins	735	5.31	−0.67
Liberal Democrats	Philip Wray	252	1.82	−1.39
Liberal Democrats	Christopher Hurley	219	1.58	−1.13
Liberal Democrats	Lawrence Eke	186	0.95	−1.37
Turnout		5,092	46.74	+2.80
Conservative hold		Swing	-8.31	
Conservative hold		Swing	-9.09	
Conservative hold		Swing	-9.27	

=== Preston Park ===
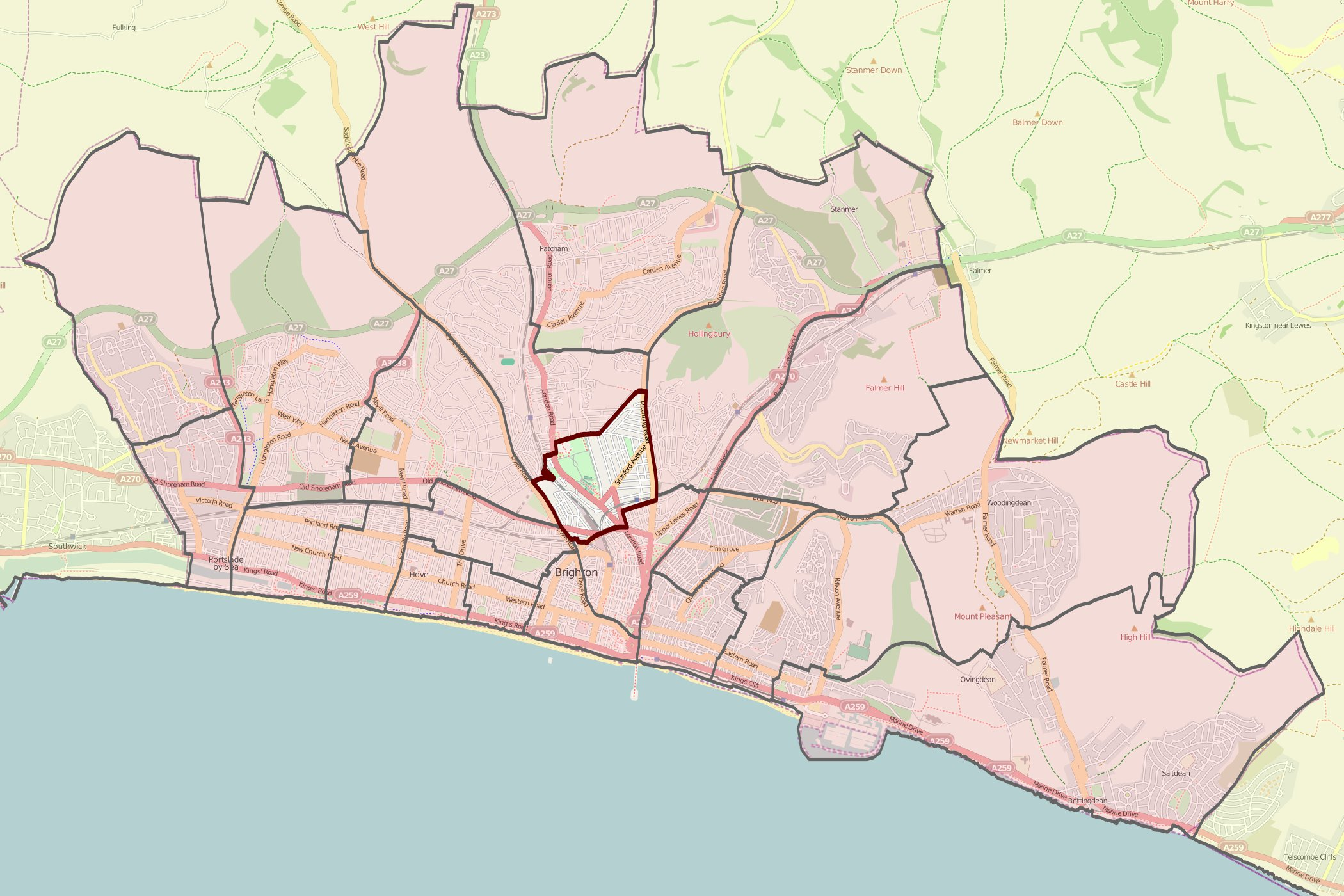
Preston Park highlighted

Preston Park (3 seats)
Party	Candidate	Votes	%	±%
Green	Amy Kennedy	2,616	16.12	+3.75
Green	Mike Jones	2,564	15.80	+6.82
Green	Leo Littman	2,291	14.12	+6.34
Labour Co-op	Kevin Allen	2,104	12.97	+1.81
Labour Co-op	Juliet McCaffery	2,063	12.71	+0.36
Labour Co-op	Tim Lunnon	1,848	11.39	+1.36
Conservative	Clive Brimmell	743	4.58	−1.14
Conservative	Georgina Dore	726	4.47	−1.18
Conservative	William Mills	667	4.11	−1.37
Liberal Democrats	Tallulah Frankland	218	1.34	−1.98
Liberal Democrats	Keith Tipping	179	1.10	−1.16
Liberal Democrats	Lee Shingles	169	1.04	−0.98
The European Citizens Party	Yuri Borgmann-Prebil	37	0.23	N/A
Turnout		5,708	52.76	+7.85
Green hold		Swing	+0.81	
Green gain from Labour Co-op		Swing	+5.46	
Green gain from Labour Co-op		Swing	+6.11	

=== Queen's Park ===
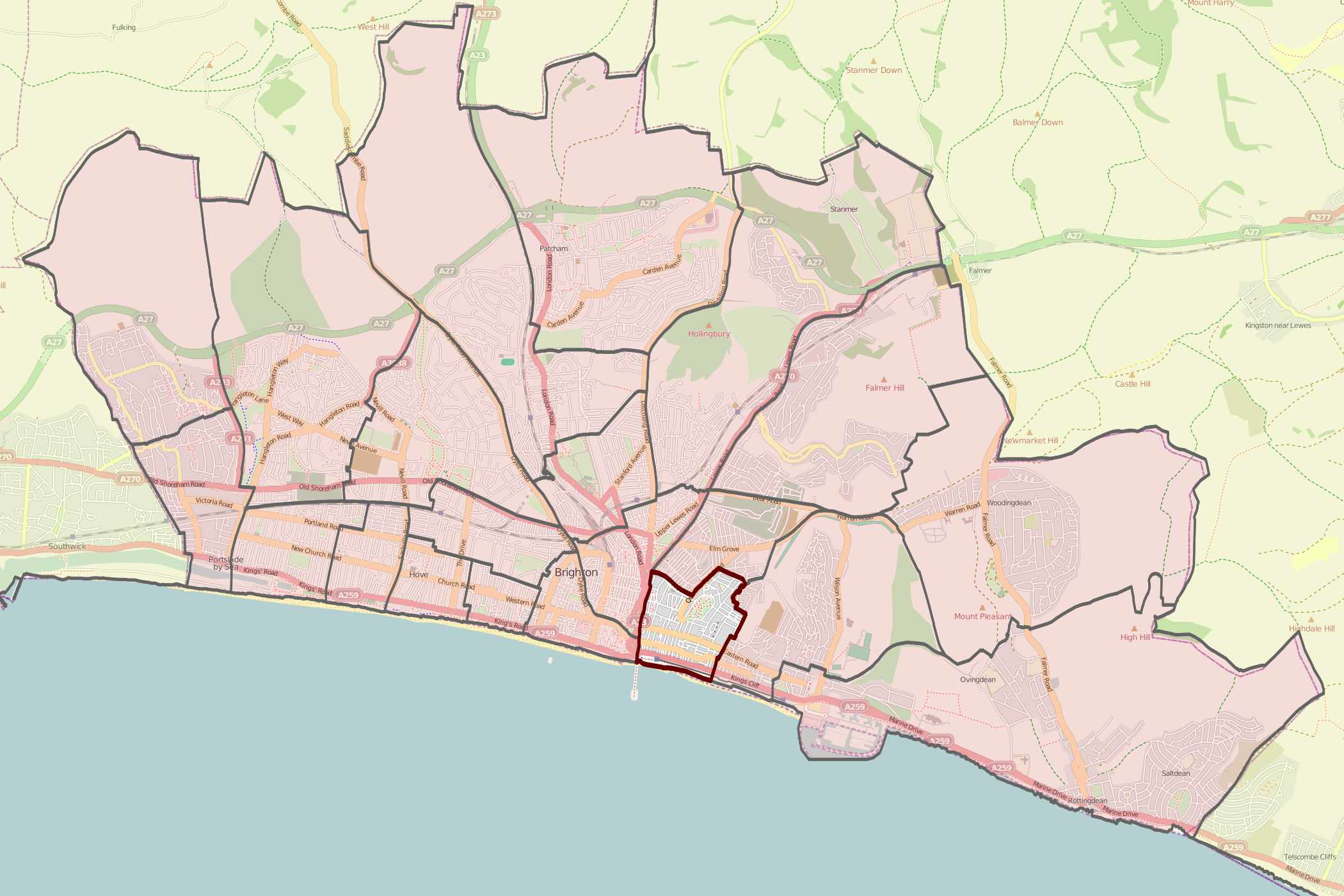
Queen's Park highlighted

Queen's Park (3 seats)
Party	Candidate	Votes	%	±%
Green	Geoffrey Bowden	2,227	14.72	+0.46
Green	Stephanie Powell	2,221	14.68	+2.58
Green	Ben Duncan	2,147	14.19	+2.69
Labour Co-op	Daniel Chapman	1,970	13.02	+1.63
Labour Co-op	Christopher Cooke	1,867	12.34	+0.98
Labour Co-op	Tom French	1,822	12.04	+0.97
Conservative	Philip Brownlie	766	5.06	−2.17
Conservative	Anne Glow	738	4.88	−1.52
Conservative	Gail Woodcock	653	4.32	−1.55
Liberal Democrats	Elizabeth Robinson	237	1.57	−1.31
Liberal Democrats	Jacob Frohawk-Mclucas	189	1.25	−1.59
Liberal Democrats	Brian Ralfe	155	1.02	−1.35
Independent	Mohammed Asaduzzaman	140	0.93	N/A
Turnout		5,335	45.49	+5.50
Green hold		Swing	-1.17	
Green hold		Swing	+1.60	
Green hold		Swing	+1.72	

=== Regency ===
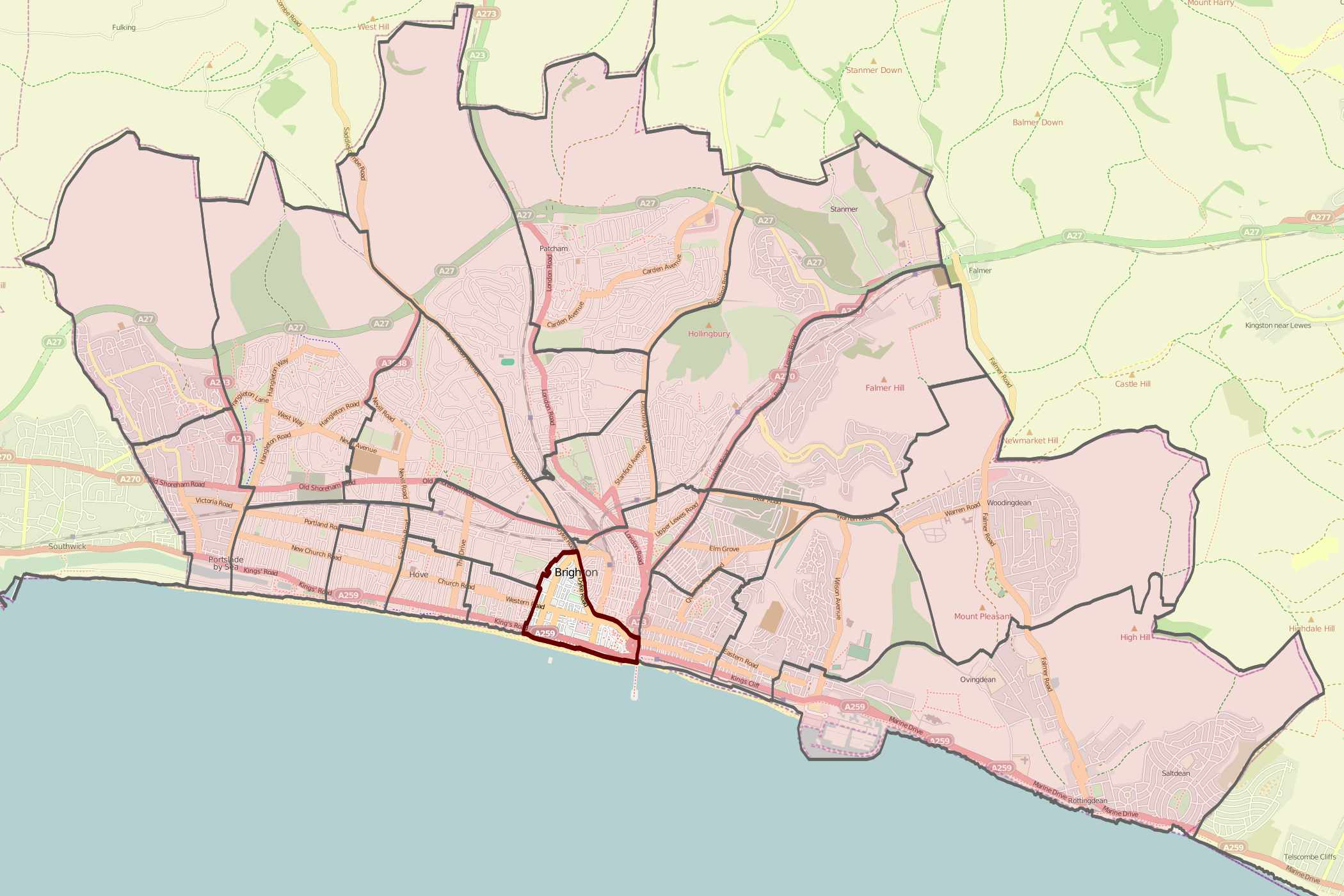
Regency highlighted

Regency (2 seats)
Party	Candidate	Votes	%	±%
Green	Ania Kitcat	1,696	28.53	+11.34
Green	Jason Kitcat	1,629	27.40	+11.30
Labour Co-op	James Asser	691	11.62	−0.03
Labour Co-op	Dan Wilson	665	11.19	+1.98
Conservative	Andrew Hancox	494	8.31	−2.33
Conservative	Michael MacFarlane	449	7.55	−3.27
Liberal Democrats	Gareth Jones	166	2.79	−6.57
Liberal Democrats	Larissa Rowe	155	2.61	−6.15
Turnout		3,092	38.91	+5.16
Green hold		Swing	+11.37	
Green hold		Swing	+10.93	

=== Rottingdean Coastal ===
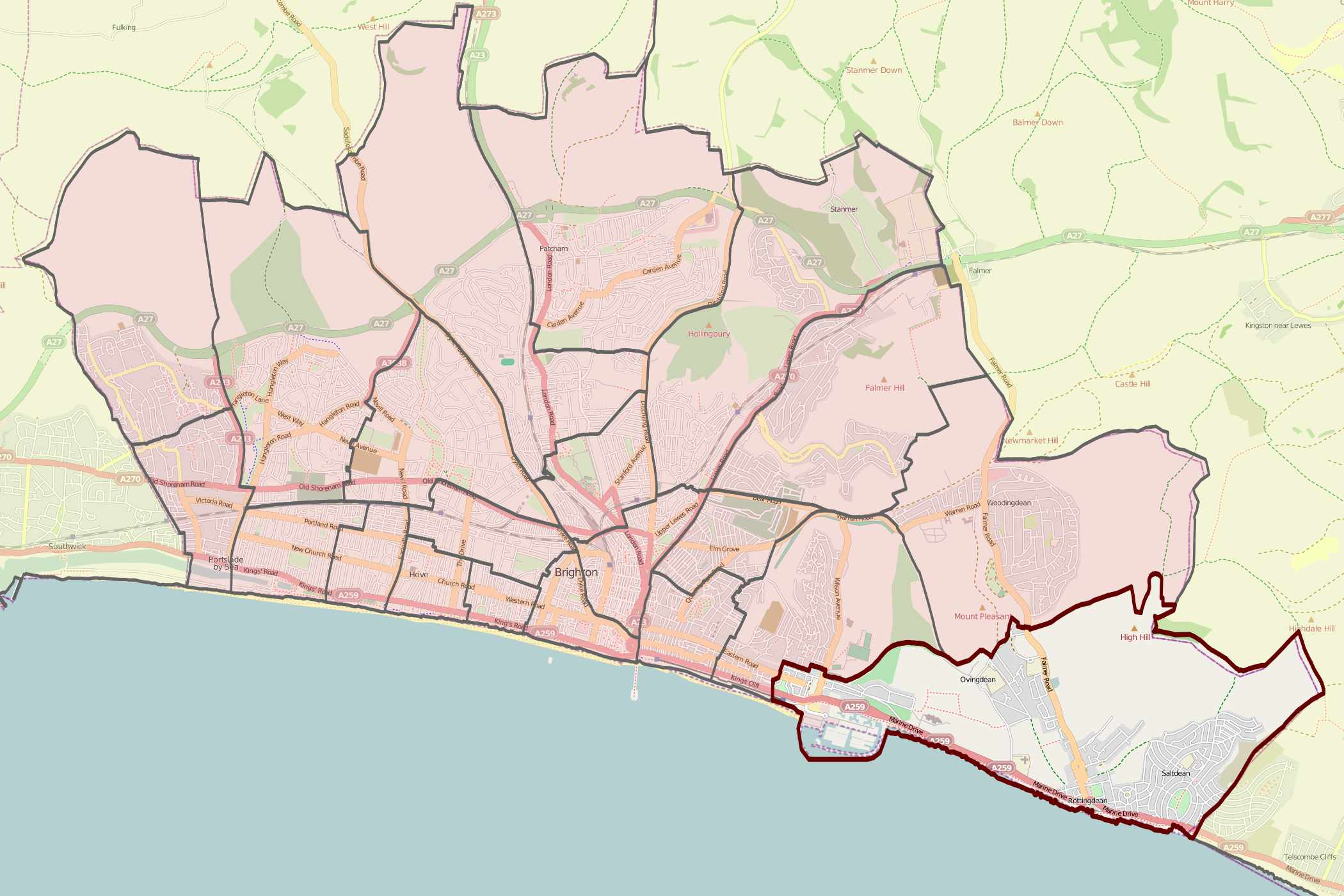
Rottingdean Coastal highlighted

Rottingdean Coastal (3 seats)
Party	Candidate	Votes	%	±%
Conservative	Lynda Hyde	2,642	19.19	−1.49
Conservative	Mary Mears	2,433	17.67	−1.99
Conservative	David Smith	2,219	16.12	−3.65
Labour Co-op	Tony Frisby	1,053	7.65	+3.37
Labour Co-op	Michael Adams	1,044	7.58	+4.23
Green	Andrew Coleman	1,000	7.26	+0.38
Labour Co-op	Harris Fitch	931	6.76	+3.42
Green	Rebecca Duffy	692	5.03	−1.07
Green	Stuart Hay	679	4.93	−0.80
Liberal Democrats	Harry Dienes	483	3.51	−0.61
Liberal Democrats	Barry Pinchen	310	2.25	−1.37
Liberal Democrats	Paul Perrin	283	2.06	−0.42
Turnout		4,992	46.52	+4.77
Conservative hold		Swing	-2.26	
Conservative hold		Swing	-3.84	
Conservative hold		Swing	-4.81	

=== South Portslade ===
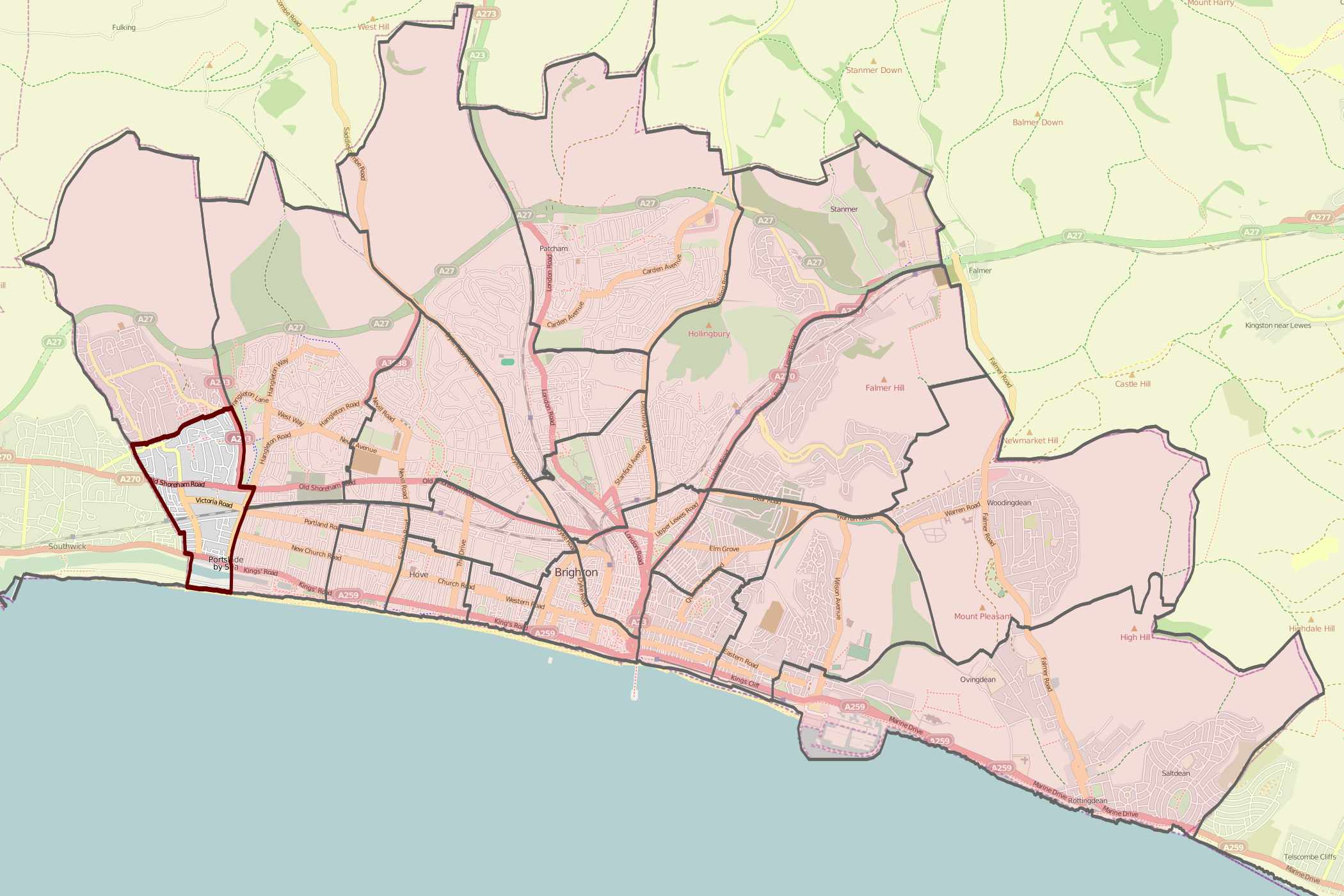
South Portslade highlighted

South Portslande (2 seats)
Party	Candidate	Votes	%	±%
Labour Co-op	Leslie Hamilton	1,580	28.04	+6.70
Labour Co-op	Alan Robins	1,234	21.90	+2.87
Conservative	Stephen Harbor-Wade	941	16.70	−3.15
Conservative	Steve Harmer-Strange	830	14.73	−5.50
Green	Cathy Marchland	398	7.06	+1.05
Green	Steve Watson	263	4.67	+1.07
Liberal Democrats	Ken Rist	208	3.69	−1.63
Liberal Democrats	Peter Denyer	180	3.19	−1.42
Turnout		3,053	43.35	+2.65
Labour Co-op hold		Swing	+9.85	
Labour Co-op gain from Conservative		Swing	+8.37	

=== St Peter's and North Laine ===
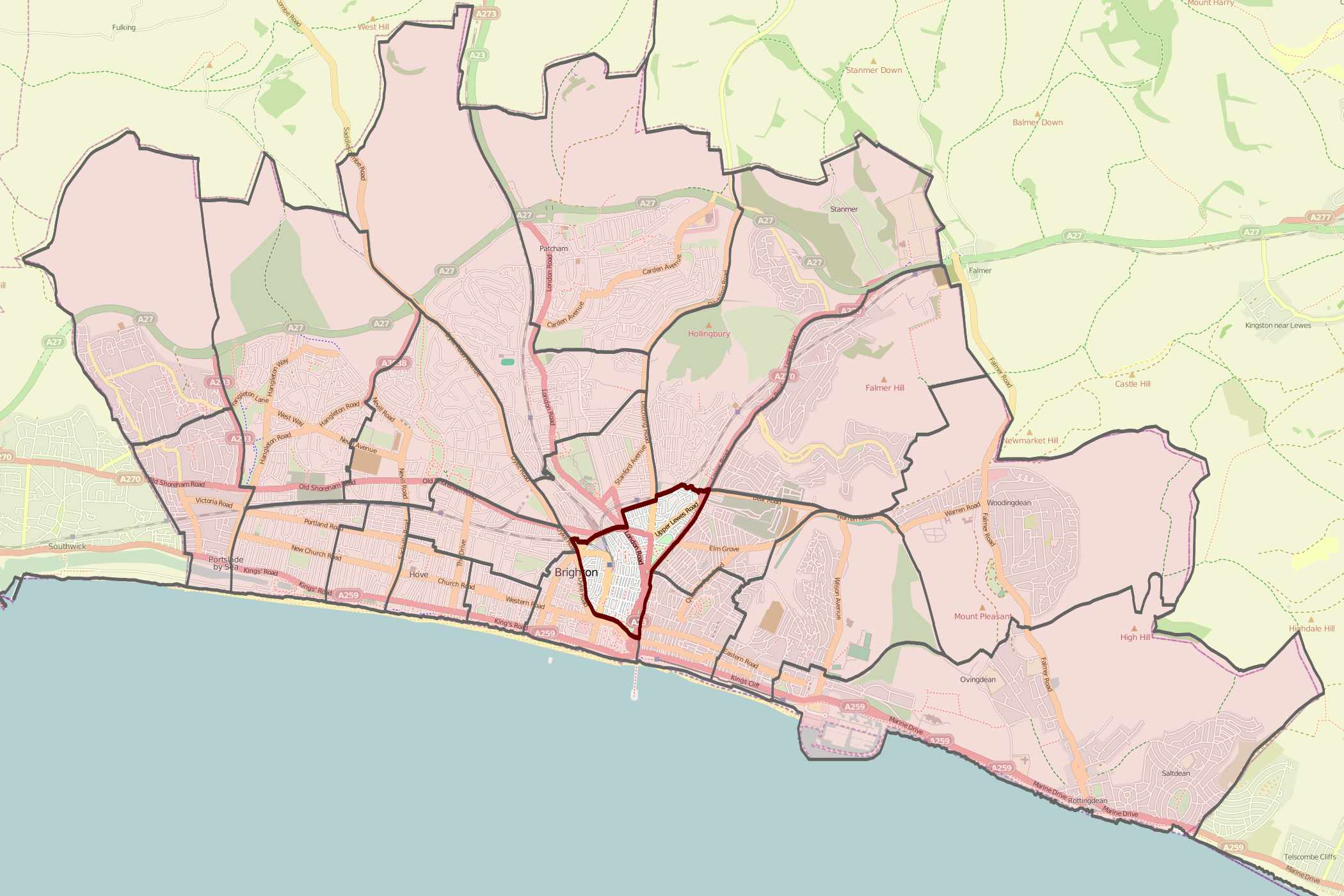
St Peter's and North Laine highlighted

St Peter's and North Laine (3 seats)
Party	Candidate	Votes	%	±%
Green	Lizzie Deane	3,407	22.41	+3.21
Green	Ian Davey	3,132	20.02	+2.52
Green	Pete West	3,043	19.45	+1.85
Labour Co-op	Clare Calder	1,326	8.48	+0.32
Labour Co-op	James Hallwood	1,148	7.34	−0.34
Labour Co-op	Peter Gillman	1,137	7.27	−0.09
Conservative	Mike Long	490	3.13	−1.08
Conservative	Joseph Tansey	481	3.07	−1.09
Conservative	Patrick Ward	480	3.07	−0.63
Liberal Democrats	David Sears	316	2.02	−1.08
Liberal Democrats	William Parker	240	1.53	−0.85
Liberal Democrats	Graham Hunnable	231	1.48	−1.10
UKIP	Sabiha Choudhury	134	0.86	N/A
Independent	Gerald O'Brien	81	0.52	N/A
Turnout		5,508	41.40	+7.28
Green hold		Swing	+2.89	
Green hold		Swing	+2.54	
Green hold		Swing	+2.26	

=== Westbourne ===
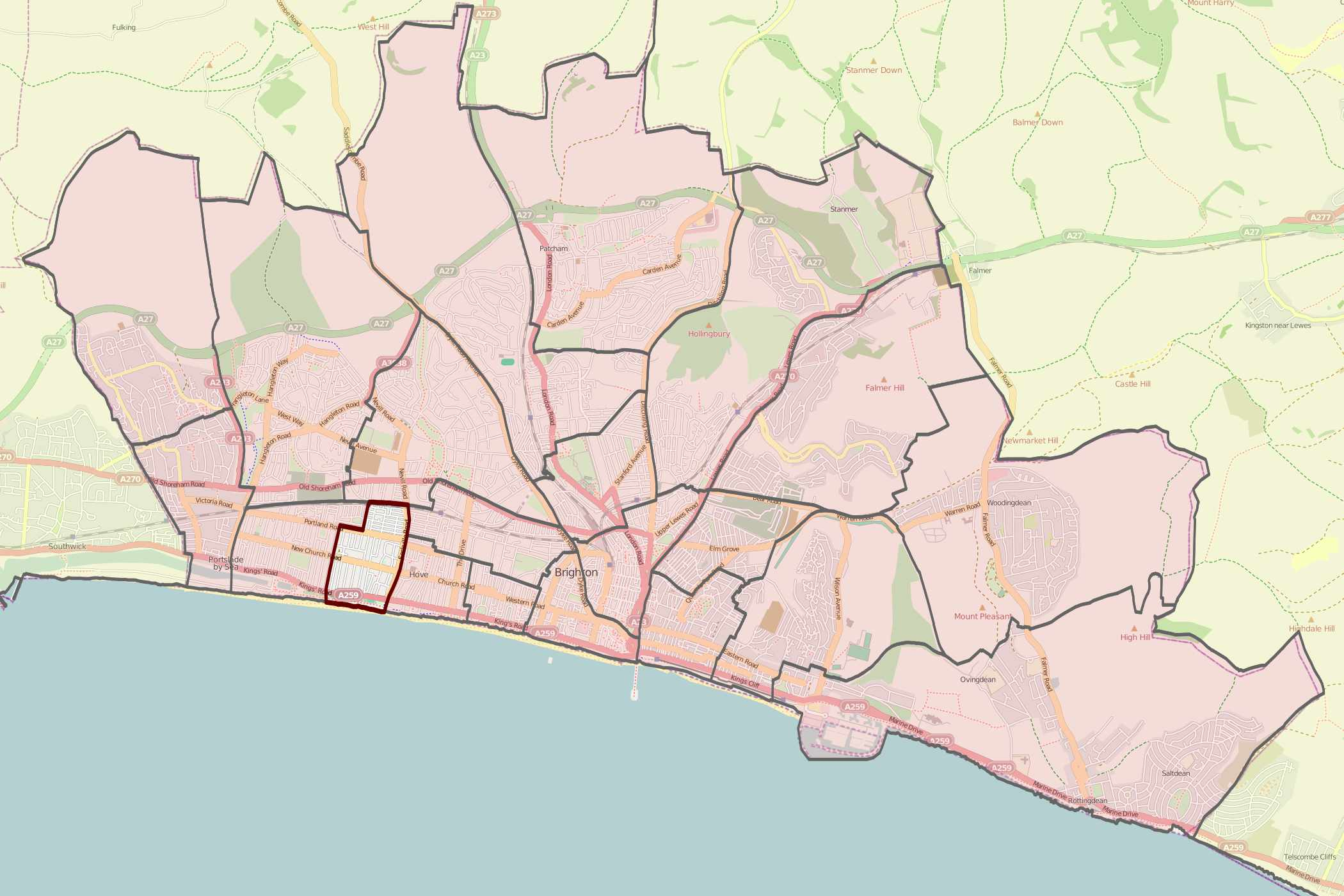
Westbourne highlighted

Westbourne (2 seats)
Party	Candidate	Votes	%	±%
Conservative	Brian Oxley	1,228	19.74	−6.93
Conservative	Denise Cobb	1,152	18.51	−7.62
Labour Co-op	Simon Battle	1,020	16.39	+4.38
Green	Louisa Greenbaum	911	14.64	+6.58
Labour Co-op	Jacqueline Teeboon	807	12.97	+3.22
Green	Ray Cunningham	615	9.88	+1.82
Liberal Democrats	June Batchelor	264	4.24	−0.56
Liberal Democrats	Coreen Sears	186	2.99	+0.46
The European Citizens Party	Susan Collard	39	0.64	N/A
Turnout		3,388	45.52	+6.66
Conservative hold		Swing	-11.31	
Conservative hold		Swing	-12.51	

=== Wish ===
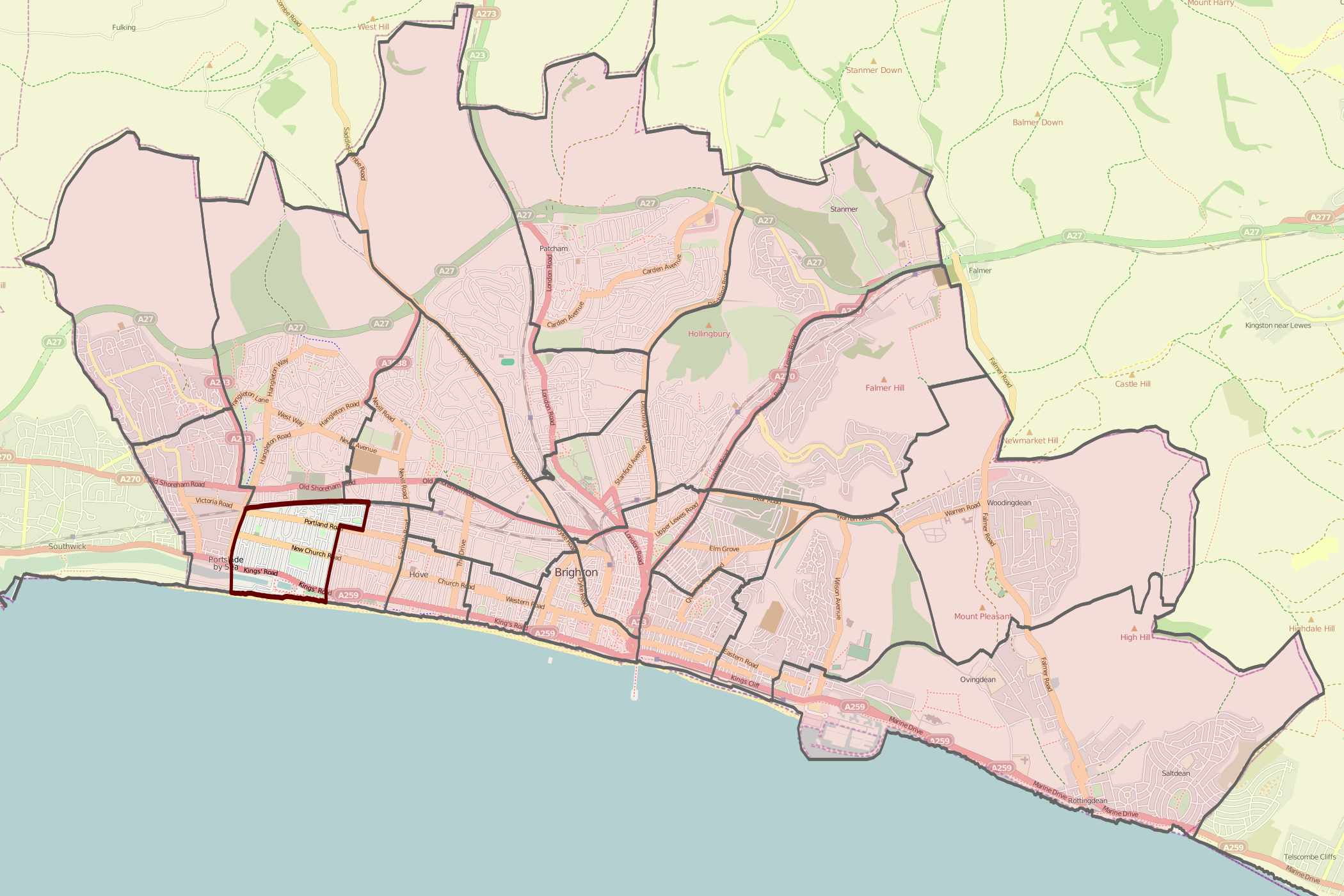
Wish highlighted

Wish (2 seats)
Party	Candidate	Votes	%	±%
Labour Co-op	Anne Pissaridou	1,348	19.95	+6.84
Conservative	Garry Dunn	1,310	19.38	−6.32
Conservative	Ted Kemble	1,183	17.51	−7.01
Labour Co-op	Christine Robinson	1,144	16.93	+4.03
Green	Sue Baumgardt	540	7.99	+0.62
Independent	Jenny Barnard-Langston	301	4.45	N/A
Green	Anton Simanowitz	299	4.42	+0.06
Independent	Mark Barnard	244	3.61	N/A
Liberal Democrats	Bob Bailey	170	2.52	−1.81
Liberal Democrats	Daniel Russell	119	1.76	−2.27
UKIP	Richard Allden	100	1.48	N/A
Turnout		3,572	51.10	+4.52
Labour Co-op gain from Conservative		Swing	+13.85	
Conservative hold		Swing	-10.14	

=== Withdean ===
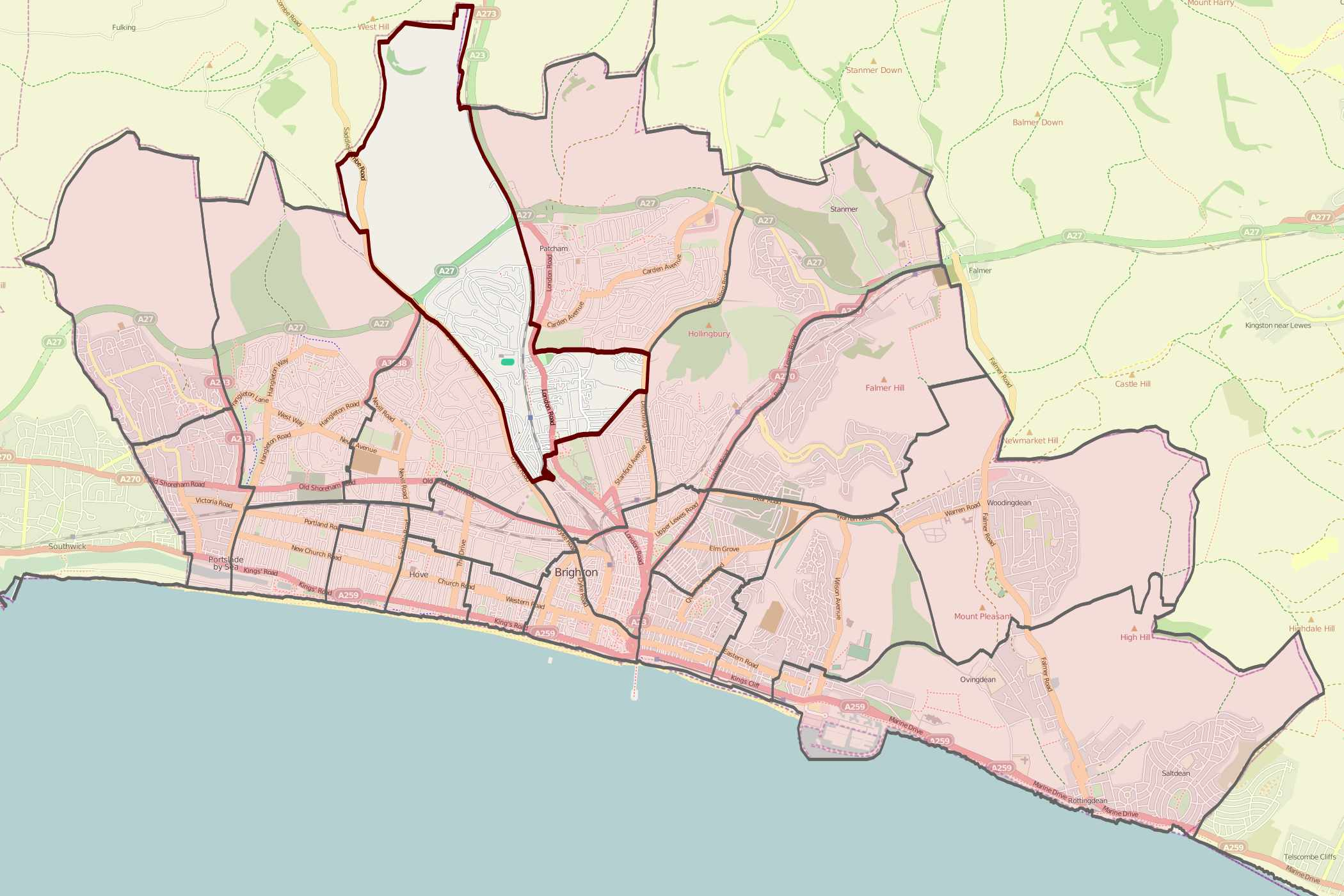
Withdean highlighted

Withdean (3 seats)
Party	Candidate	Votes	%	±%
Green	Sue Shanks	2,184	13.86	+8.51
Conservative	Ann Norman	2,105	13.35	−2.01
Conservative	Ken Norman	1,992	12.64	−2.26
Conservative	Robert Németh	1,891	12.00	−3.57
Green	Paul Philo	1,810	11.48	+6.51
Green	Jacqui Cuff	1,672	10.61	+6.83
Labour Co-op	Caraline Brown	1,222	7.75	+2.17
Labour Co-op	Susan Darby	1,164	7.38	+1.96
Labour Co-op	Fraser Kemp	983	6.24	+1.10
Liberal Democrats	John Lovatt	309	1.96	−1.27
Liberal Democrats	Robert Stockman	218	1.38	−1.48
Liberal Democrats	Hyder Khalil	213	1.35	−1.33
Turnout		5,447	50.95	+7.27
Green gain from Conservative		Swing	+12.08	
Conservative hold		Swing	-7.04	
Conservative hold		Swing	-4.59	

=== Woodingdean ===
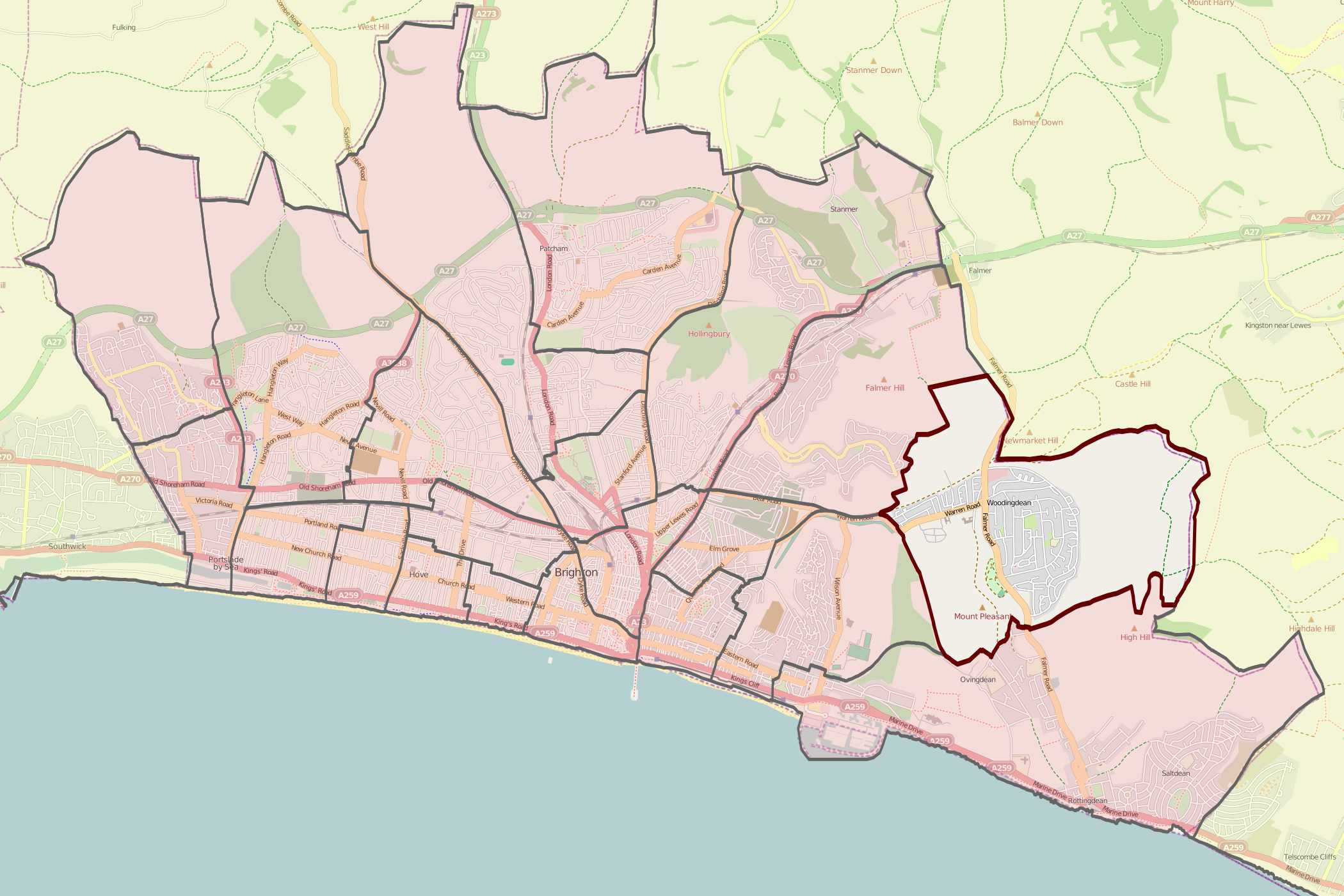
Woodingdean highlighted

Woodingdean (2 seats)
Party	Candidate	Votes	%	±%
Conservative	Dee Simson	1,619	27.80	−5.35
Conservative	Geoff Wells	1,565	26.87	−6.22
Labour Co-op	Susan Burns	853	14.65	+4.78
Labour Co-op	Julian Hayes	756	13.14	+4.11
Green	Andrea Finch	403	6.92	+2.95
Green	Karen James	259	4.45	+1.00
UKIP	Graham Townsend	159	2.73	N/A
Liberal Democrats	Christine-Reba Edge	121	2.08	−2.18
Liberal Democrats	Anthony Eke	89	1.53	−1.64
Turnout		3,149	42.73	+3.89
Conservative hold		Swing	-10.13	
Conservative hold		Swing	-10.33	
