= Preston Park (ward) =

Ward of Brighton and Hove

- ward Brighton & Hove City Council
- Boundary of Preston Park in Brighton and Hove from 2003.
- Population: 14,999 (2021)

Current ward
- Created: 2003
- Councillor: Steve Davis (Green)
- Councillor: Kerry Picket (Green)
- Councillor: Liz Loughran (Labour)

Preston Park is an electoral ward in Brighton, England. The population of the ward at the 2021 census was 14,999. The ward elects three councillors to Brighton and Hove City Council; as of 28 February 2025, they are Steve Davis and Kerry Picket of the Green Party and Liz Loughran of the Labour Party. The ward is part of the parliamentary constituency of Brighton Pavilion.
