= Brighton and Hove City Council =

Local authority for Brighton and Hove

- Coat of arms

Type
- Type: Unitary authority

History
- Founded: 1 April 1997

Leadership
- Mayor: Theresa Fowler, Labour since 21 May 2026
- Leader: Bella Sankey, Labour since 25 May 2023
- Chief executive: Jess Gibbons since 18 March 2024

Structure
- Seats: 54 councillors
- Graph of the party split among 54 seats.
- Political groups: Administration (31) Labour (31) Other parties (23) Green (12) Conservative (5) B&H Ind. (2) Independent (4)
- Joint committees: Greater Brighton City Board
- Length of term: 4 years

Elections
- Voting system: Plurality block voting
- Last election: 4 May 2023
- Next election: 6 May 2027

Meeting place
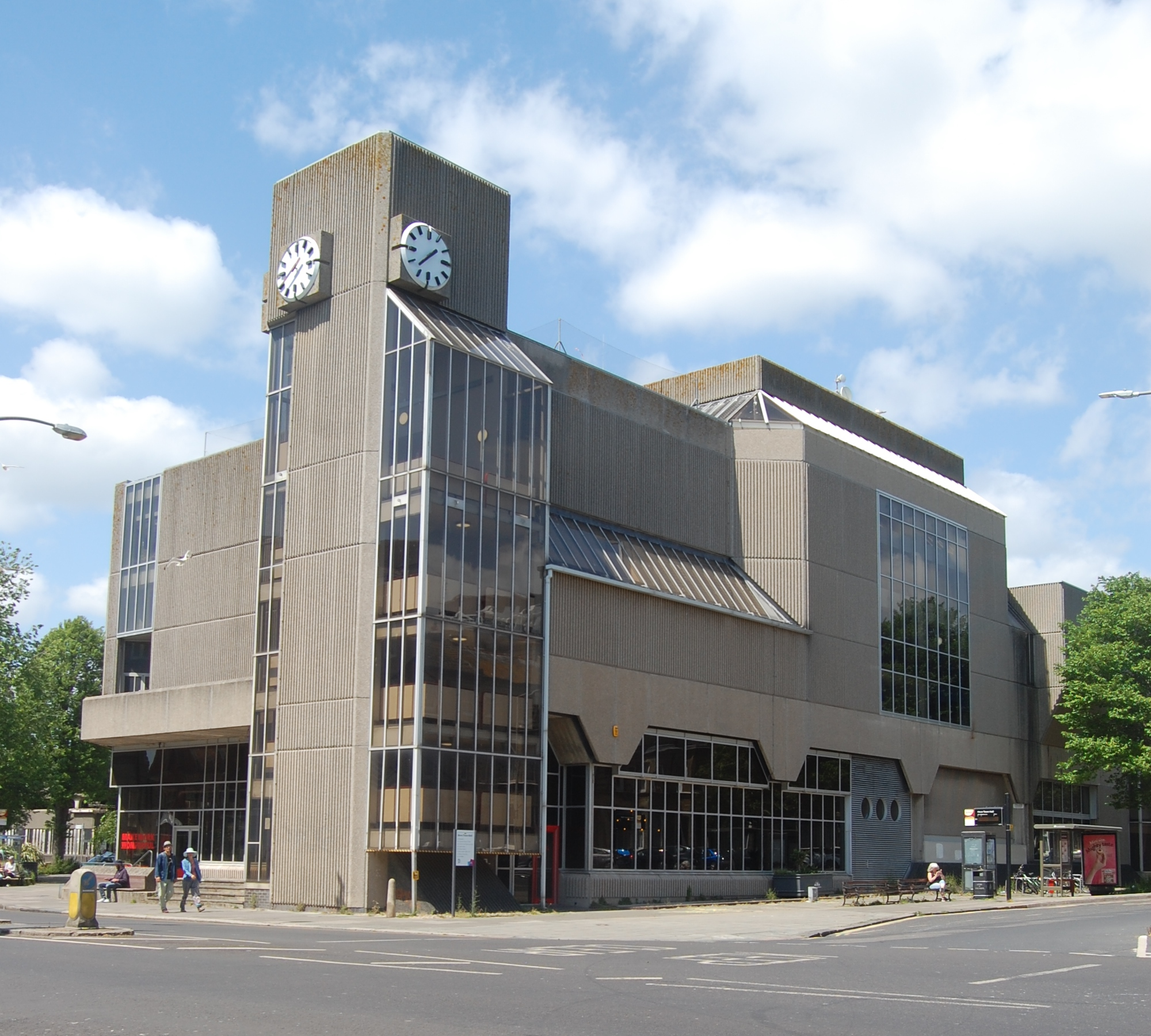
- Hove Town Hall, Norton Road, Hove, BN3 3BQ

Website
- brighton-hove.gov.uk

Brighton and Hove City Council is the local authority for Brighton and Hove, a local government district with city status in the ceremonial county of East Sussex, England. The council is a unitary authority, being a district council which also performs the functions of a county council. The council has been under Labour majority control since 2023. It is based at Hove Town Hall.

In 2026 the council became a member of the Sussex and Brighton Strategic Authority.

== History ==
The district of Brighton and Hove was created in 1997 as a merger of the former Borough of Brighton and Borough of Hove, both of which had been lower-tier districts with East Sussex County Council providing county-level services prior to 1997. The new district was removed from the non-metropolitan county of East Sussex to also become its own non-metropolitan county, but with no county council; instead the district council performs both district and county functions, making it a unitary authority. For the purposes of lieutenancy and shrievalty, Brighton and Hove remains part of the wider ceremonial county of East Sussex.

The new district was awarded borough status from its creation on 1 April 1997, allowing the chair of the council to take the title of mayor. The borough was additionally awarded city status on 31 January 2001, since when the council has been called Brighton and Hove City Council.

In December 2023 the council leader declared that the council was facing bankruptcy. The same month, two councillors, mother and daughter Bharti Gajjar and Chandni Mistry, were removed from the Labour group after allegations concerning their places of residence. They both resigned from the council in March 2024, triggering by-elections.

In 2026, the council became a member of the Sussex and Brighton Strategic Authority. Local government reorganisation is also being considered for the area. In July 2026, the government announced reforms across East Sussex which included creating a larger Brighton and Hove authority that would gain some territory to the east. In September 2026 these proposals were paused for further review.

== Governance ==
The council provides both district-level and county-level services. In its capacity as a district council it is a billing authority collecting council tax and business rates, and it is responsible for town planning, housing, waste collection and environmental health. In its capacity as a county council it is a local education authority, and is responsible for social services, libraries and waste disposal. There is one civil parish in the city at Rottingdean which provides an additional tier of local government for that area; the rest of the city is an unparished area.

=== Political control ===
The council has been under Labour majority control since the 2023 election.

The first election to the council was held in 1996, initially acting as a shadow authority alongside the outgoing authorities until it came into its powers on 1 April 1997. Political control of the council since 1997 has been as follows:

Party in control	Years
Labour	1997–2003
No overall control	2003–2023
Labour	2023–present

=== Leadership ===
The role of mayor is largely ceremonial in Brighton and Hove. Political leadership is instead provided by the leader of the council. The first leader following the merger, Steve Bassam, had been the last leader of the old Brighton Borough Council. In 2011, Bill Randall of the Green Party was appointed leader, being the party's first council leader in the United Kingdom. The leaders since the council's creation in 1997 have been:

Councillor	Party	From	To
Steve Bassam	Labour	1997	Jul 1999
Lynette Gwyn-Jones	Labour	Sep 1999	2001
Ken Bodfish	Labour	2001	Jan 2006
Simon Burgess	Labour	23 Feb 2006	May 2007
Brian Oxley	Conservative	24 May 2007	15 May 2008
Mary Mears	Conservative	15 May 2008	May 2011
Bill Randall	Green	19 May 2011	17 May 2012
Jason Kitcat	Green	17 May 2012	10 May 2015
Warren Morgan	Labour	21 May 2015	May 2018
Daniel Yates	Labour	17 May 2018	22 May 2019
Nancy Platts	Labour	22 May 2019	23 July 2020
Phélim Mac Cafferty	Green	23 July 2020	May 2023
Bella Sankey	Labour	25 May 2023	

=== Composition ===
Following the 2023 election, and subsequent by-elections and changes of allegiance up to September 2026, the composition of the council was as follows:

Party	Councillors
Labour	31
Green	12
Conservative	5
Brighton and Hove Independents	2
Independent	4
Total	54

== Premises ==
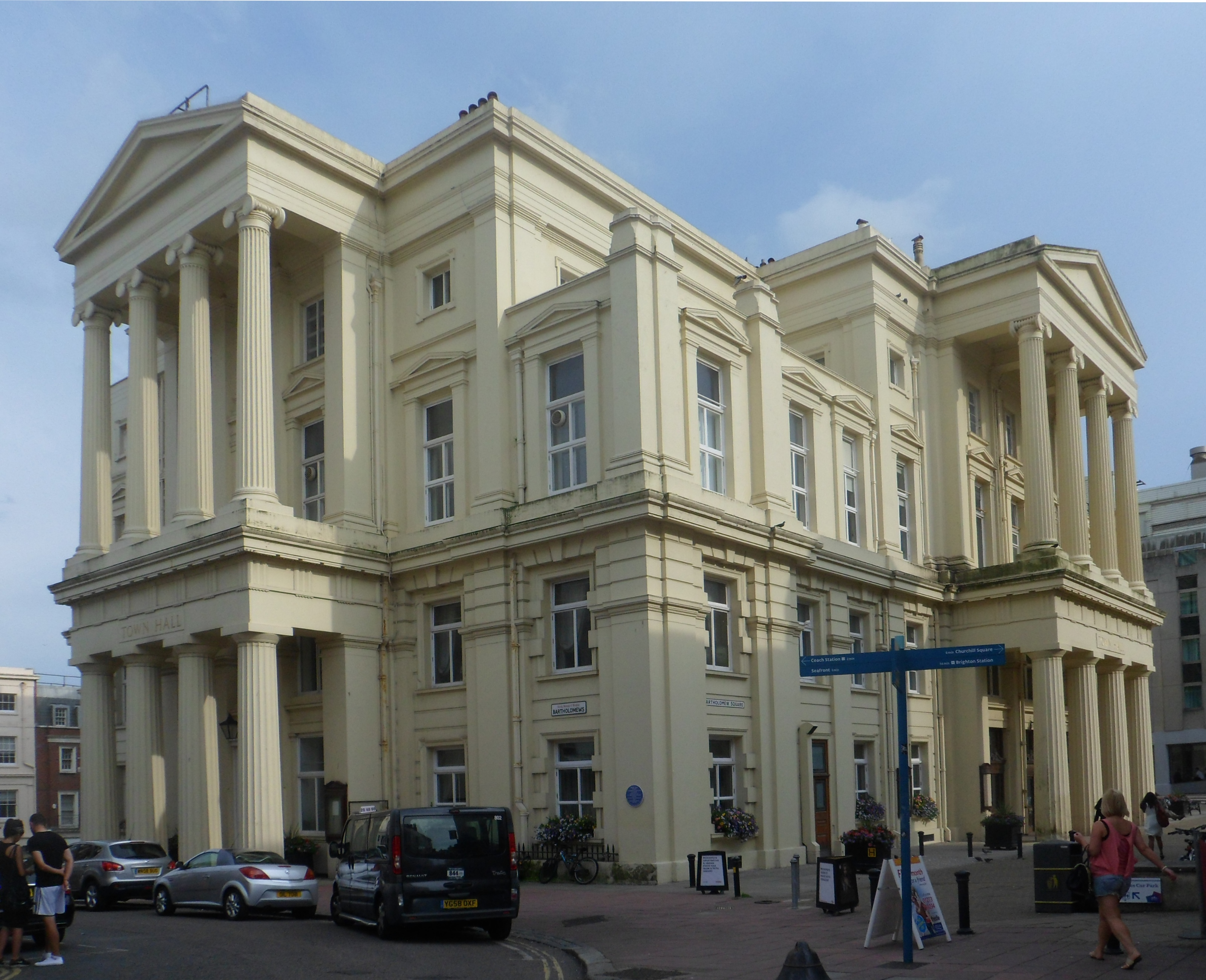
Brighton Town Hall: Used (with the adjoining Bartholomew House) for some council functions.

The council inherited Brighton Town Hall (completed 1832) and the adjoining 1980s Priory House and Bartholomew House from the old Brighton Borough Council, and Hove Town Hall (completed 1974) from the old Hove Borough Council.

Council meetings are generally held at Hove Town Hall, which also houses the council's main offices. Brighton Town Hall and Bartholomew House continue to be used as a register office, customer service centre and additional offices. Priory House was closed as council offices in 2011 and subsequently converted to residential use.

== Elections ==
Since the last boundary changes in 2023 the council has comprised 54 councillors representing 23 wards, with each ward electing two or three councillors. Elections are held every four years.

== Museums service ==
The council's museums service takes the name Royal Pavilion & Museums, and operates the Royal Pavilion, Brighton Museum and Art Gallery, Hove Museum and Art Gallery, the Booth Museum of Natural History and Preston Manor.
