= 2019 Brighton and Hove City Council election =

2019 UK local government election

- 2 May 2019

All 54 council seats 28 seats needed for a majority
- Turnout: 42.7%
	First party	Second party	Third party
	Lab	Grn	Con
Party	Labour	Green	Conservative
Last election	23 seats, 33.7%	11 seats, 24.8%	20 seats, 28.6%
Seats before	23	11	21 seats
Seats won	20	19	14
Seat change	▼3	▲8	▼7
Percentage	32.5%	34.1%	21.0%
Swing	▼1.2%	▲9.3%	▼7.6%
- Map of the results of the 2019 election, by ward.
Previous Largest Party before election
Labour
Subsequent Largest Party
Labour

Elections to Brighton and Hove City Council took place on 2 May 2019, electing all 54 members of the council, alongside other local elections in England and Northern Ireland.

The Labour Party lost 3 seats compared to the last election in 2015 but recovered its place as the largest party on the council, having seen its numbers reduced from 23 to 19 over the four years following 2015, while the strength of the Conservative group had been increased by one member in 2019, as a Labour councillor had changed allegiance shortly before the election. In addition to Labour and the Conservatives, the Green Party, which was in minority control from 2011 to 2015, fielded candidates for every seat on the council at this election.

Other parties contesting were the Liberal Democrats, the Women's Equality Party (for the first time in the city, with two candidates) and United Kingdom Independence Party, together with a number of independent candidates.

Following the election, the Labour minority administration that had governed since 2015 continued in office; however, a little over a year later, in July 2020, the Greens regained control of the Council, after the incumbent Labour administration collapsed when three Labour councillors, two of which were accused of antisemitism, quit.

== Background and campaigning ==
The Green Party lost their minority control of the council after the 2015 election, following internal disputes. Labour became the largest party on the council, winning 23 seats. This was reduced in 2017 to 22 after a Labour councillor, Michael Inkpin-Leissner, for Hollingdean and Stanmer became an independent. There have been two council by-elections since the last election: the first in 2016 in the East Brighton ward was won by Lloyd Russell-Moyle, and the second, 18 months later and for the same seat, when Russell-Moyle resigned as a councillor having been elected as MP for Brighton Kemptown.

Warren Morgan, Labour leader of the council, resigned from the position in February 2018, some attributing it to internal party conflicts related to the rise of Momentum, a left-wing campaigning group within the Labour Party, who supported many of the candidates selected for seats in the city. In February 2019 Morgan resigned his Labour membership, to form a bloc supporting The Independent Group with Inkpin-Leissner. Anne Meadows, a Labour councillor, defected to the Conservatives, making the Conservatives the largest party on the council. Fifteen councilors were reported to be standing down at this election.

Labour published its manifesto in late March, with key policies such as building 800 new council homes over the next four years, making the city carbon neutral by 2030 and auditing outsourced services and bringing them back into council services should they fail in value. Controversy came when a provisional version of the document was leaked to the local media titled the "many-fest", a 210-page document that brought together ideas from consultation of local labour members.

The Green Party also posted their manifesto and coordinated their campaigning with Young Greens of England and Wales, who organised their activists from around the country to go to Brighton in April.

The Liberal Democrats released a manifesto focusing on five major themes, including housing and homelessness, with a flagship proposal of developing 1,500 new homes on part of the council-owned Hollingbury golf course.

The Conservatives announced their proposal to use money in the city council's reserves to fund projects, as well as the establishment of a local lottery programme to invest in sports and cultural facilities. A Conservative candidate standing in the Westbourne ward was forced to resign during the local campaigning period due to him posting islamophobic and other offensive jokes online.

A hustings for the elections – which focused on community housing in the city – was hosted on 27 March with councillors from Labour, the Conservatives, the Green Party and a Liberal Democrat candidate.

== Summary ==
=== Election result ===
2019 Brighton & Hove City Council election
Party	Candidates	Seats	Gains	Losses	Net gain/loss	Seats %	Votes %	Votes	+/−
Labour	54	20	2	5	▼3	37.0	34.6	76,088	–1.0
Green	54	19	8	0	▲8	35.2	36.5	80,148	+10.3
Conservative	54	14	0	6	▼6	25.9	21.9	48,247	–8.3
Independent	5	1	1	0	▲1	1.9	1.6	3,493	+1.4
Liberal Democrats	26	0	0	0	Steady	0.0	3.8	8,384	+0.5
UKIP	11	0	0	0	Steady	0.0	1.0	2,253	–2.7
Women's Equality	2	0	0	0	Steady	0.0	0.6	1,213	N/A

== Wards and candidates ==
Details of the candidates for the 21 wards of the authority were published by the council after nominations closed on 3 April.

=== Brunswick and Adelaide ===
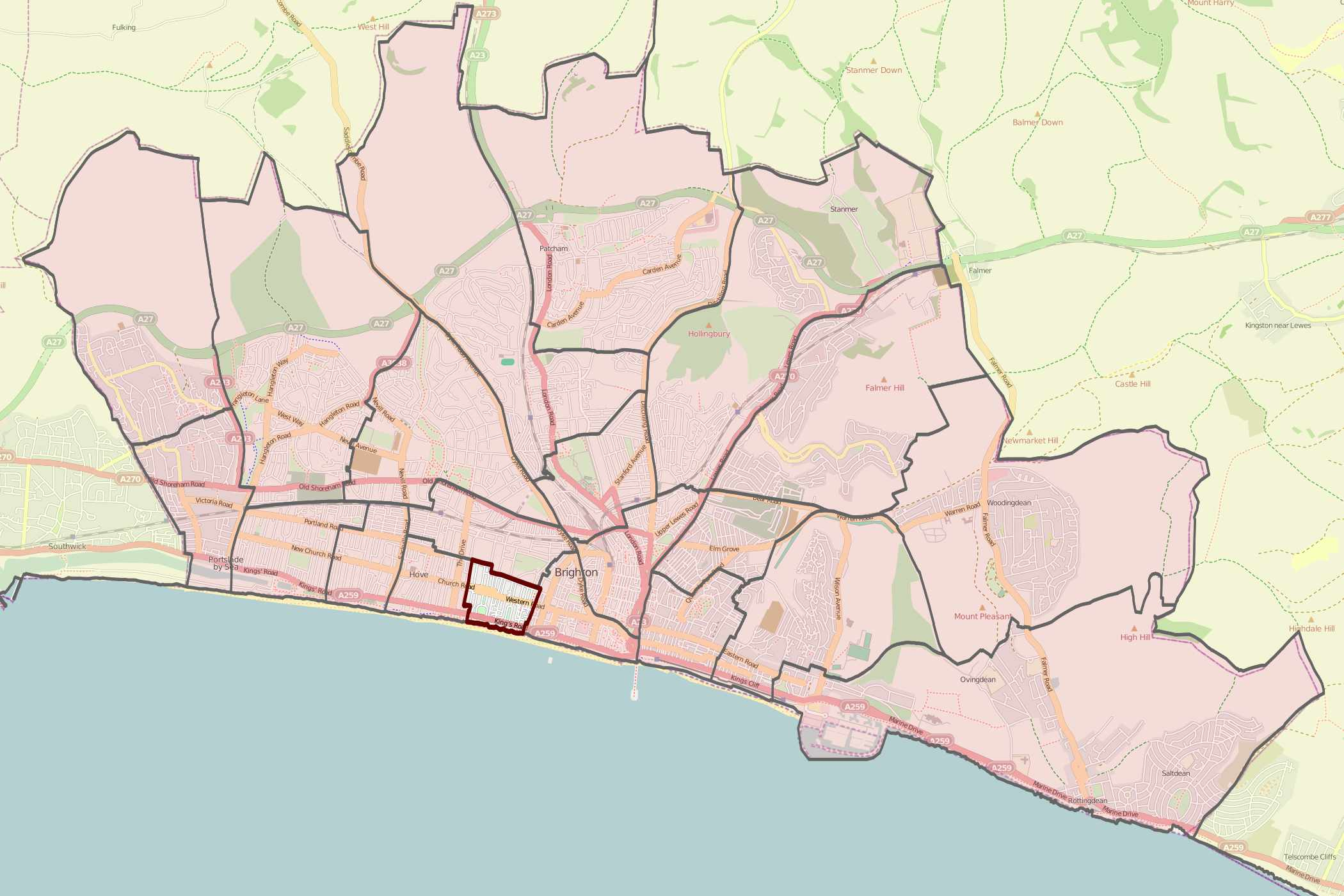
Brunswick and Adelaide highlighted

Brunswick and Adelaide (2 seats)
Party	Candidate	Votes	%	±%
Green	Hannah Clare	1,697	53.1	
Green	Phélim Mac Cafferty	1,654	51.8	
Labour	Joy Robinson	1,035	32.4	
Labour	Darryl Telles	785	24.6	
Conservative	Roz Rawcliffe	263	8.2	
Conservative	Tricia Dearlove	261	8.2	
Liberal Democrats	Christian Chadwick	230	7.2	
Liberal Democrats	Duncan Moore	203	6.4	
UKIP	John Gartside	116	3.6	
Majority		619	19.4	
Turnout		3,211	42.73	−11.32
Rejected ballots		18	0.6	
Registered electors		7,515		
Green hold		Swing		
Green hold		Swing		

=== Central Hove ===
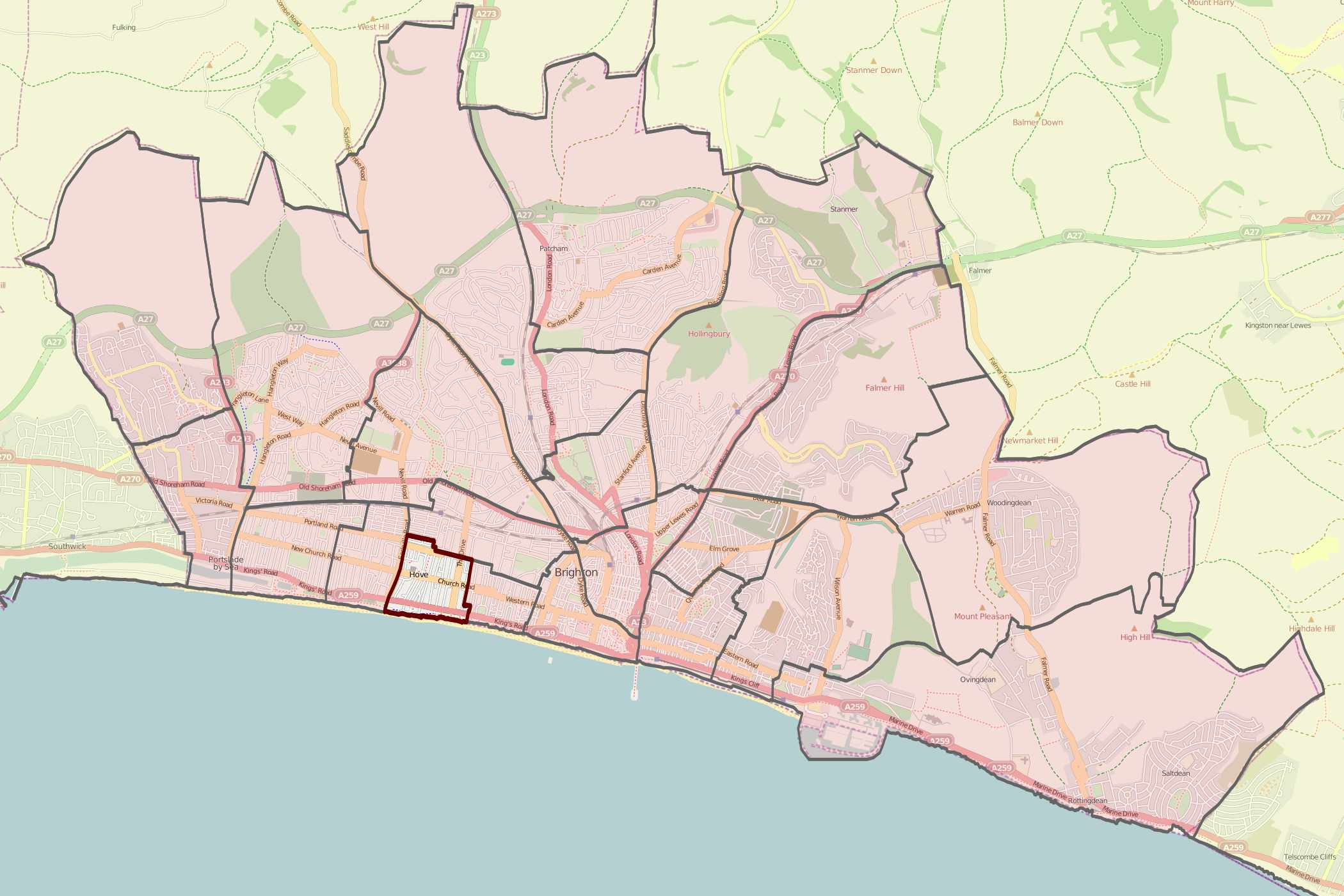
Central Hove highlighted

Central Hove (2 seats)
Party	Candidate	Votes	%	±%
Labour	Clare Moonan	1,370	45.5	
Labour	Gary Wilkinson	1,053	34.9	
Green	Aditi Bhonagiri	1,013	33.6	
Green	Carol Bullock	639	21.2	
Conservative	Steve Barrey	586	19.4	
Conservative	Rico Wojtulewicz	510	16.9	
Women's Equality	Jessie MacNeil-Brown	282	9.4	N/A
Liberal Democrats	David John Sears	224	7.4	
UKIP	Nigel Furness	122	4.0	
Majority		40	1.3	
Turnout		3,025	41.77	−10.82
Rejected ballots		12	0.4	
Registered electors		7,242		
Labour hold		Swing		
Labour gain from Conservative		Swing		

=== East Brighton ===
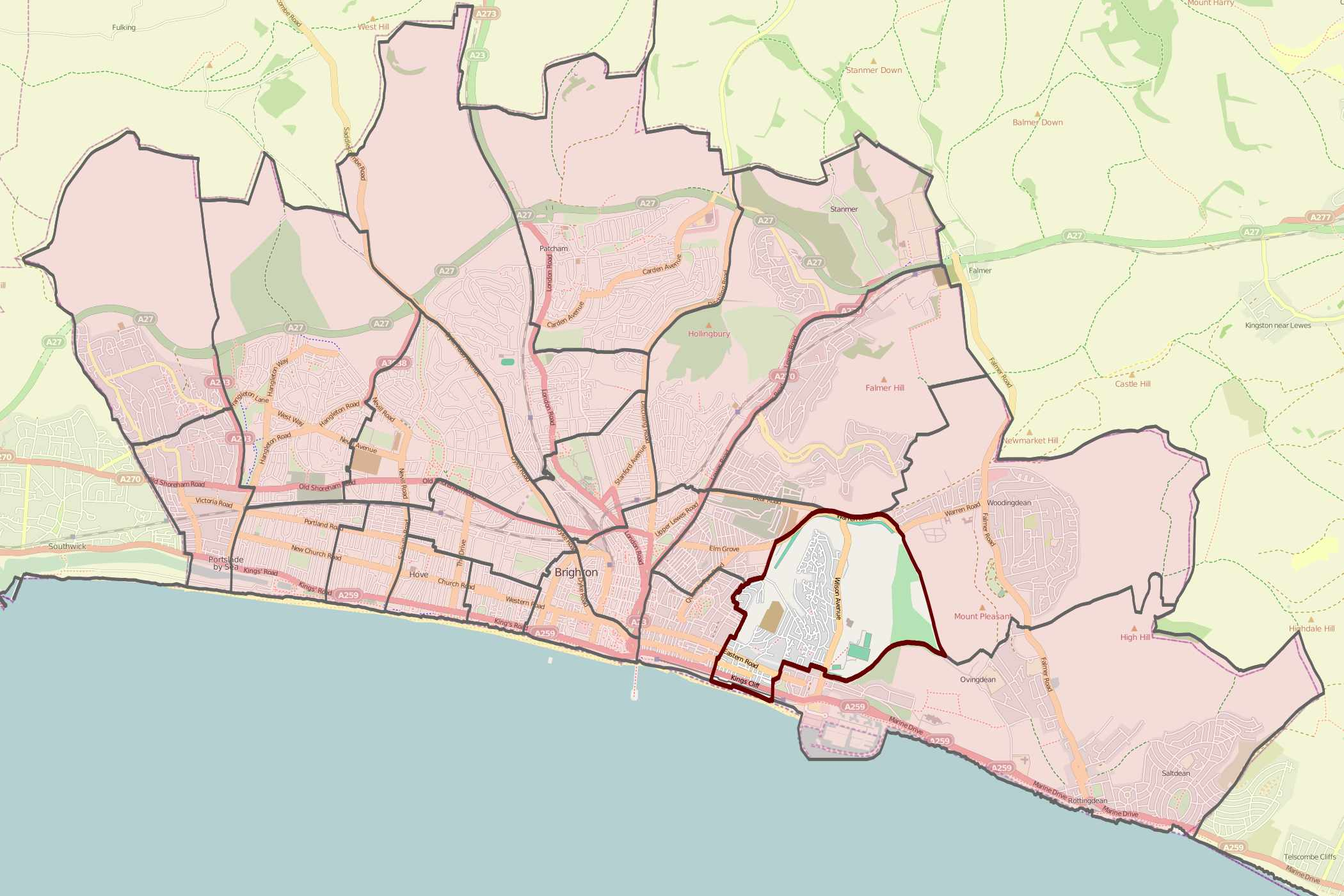
East Brighton highlighted

East Brighton (3 seats)
Party	Candidate	Votes	%	±%
Labour	Nancy Platts	1,887	54.0	
Labour	Nichole Brennan	1,652	47.2	
Labour	Gill Williams	1,582	45.2	
Green	Anna Shepherd	976	27.9	
Green	Patrick Coyle	778	22.2	
Conservative	Anthony Meadows	574	16.4	
Green	Paul Steedman	547	15.6	
Conservative	William Rudrum	525	15.0	
Conservative	Harvey Soper	495	14.2	
Independent	David Trangmar	438	12.5	N/A
Liberal Democrats	Paul Chandler	338	9.7	
Majority		606	17.3	
Turnout		3,527	33.94	−11.86
Rejected ballots		30	0.9	
Registered electors		10,392		
Labour hold		Swing		
Labour hold		Swing		
Labour hold		Swing		

=== Goldsmid ===
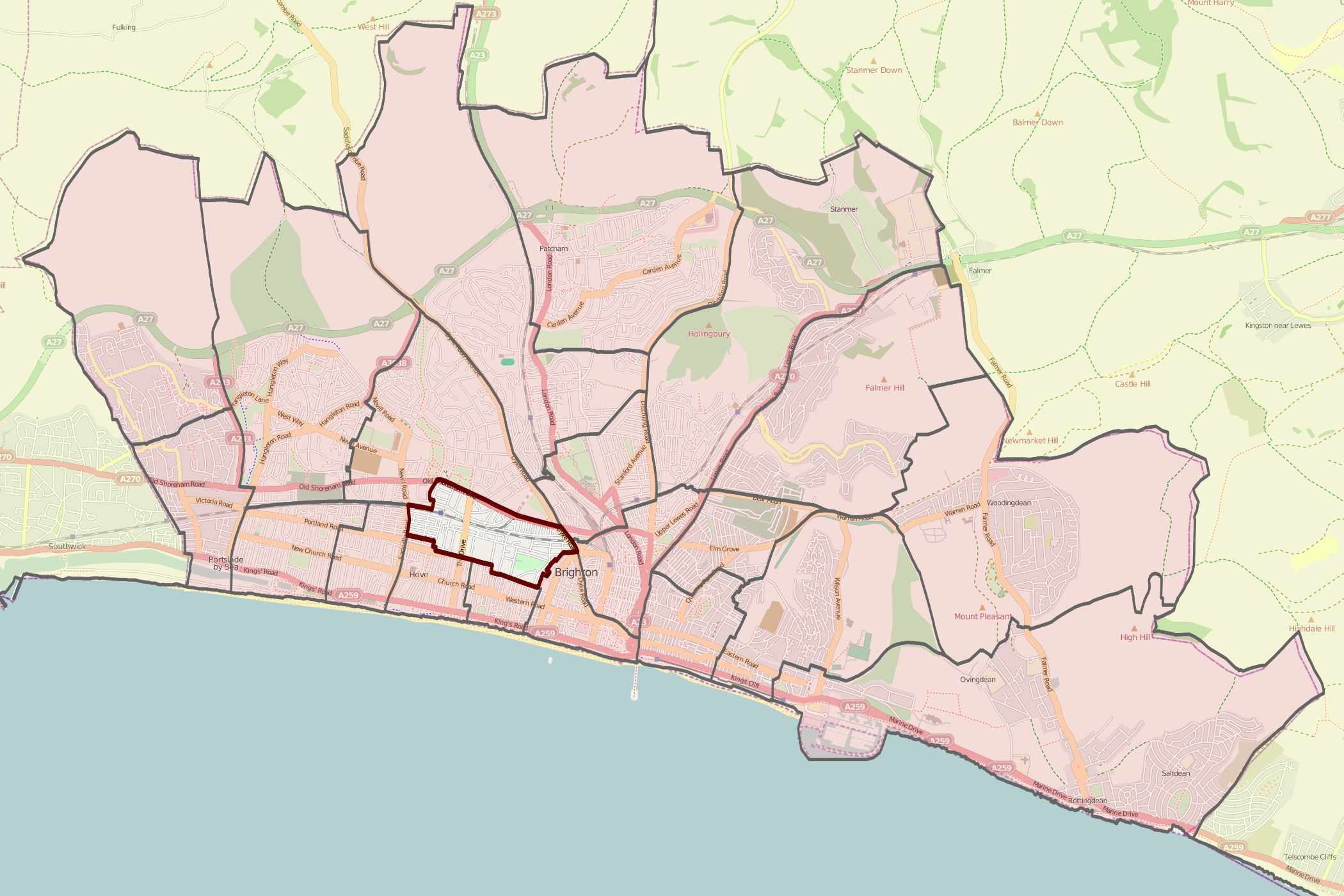
Goldsmid highlighted

Goldsmid (3 seats)
Party	Candidate	Votes	%	±%
Green	Marianna Ebel	2,258	41.8	
Labour	Jackie O’Quinn	2,145	39.7	
Labour	John Allcock	2,049	37.9	
Green	Raphael Hill	1,962	36.3	
Labour	Debbie Taylor	1,911	35.4	
Green	Steve Moses	1,772	32.8	
Conservative	Steve Harmer-Strange	677	12.5	
Conservative	Martin Hugo Hess	651	12.0	
Conservative	Peter Alan Revell	620	11.5	
Liberal Democrats	Orla May	538	10.0	N/A
Liberal Democrats	Andrew England	514	9.5	N/A
Liberal Democrats	Laura Mullin	398	7.4	N/A
UKIP	Carl Taylor	183	3.4	
Majority		87	1.6	
Turnout		5,424	45.24	−7.97
Rejected ballots		19	0.4	
Registered electors		11,990		
Green hold		Swing		
Labour hold		Swing		
Labour hold		Swing		

=== Hangleton and Knoll ===
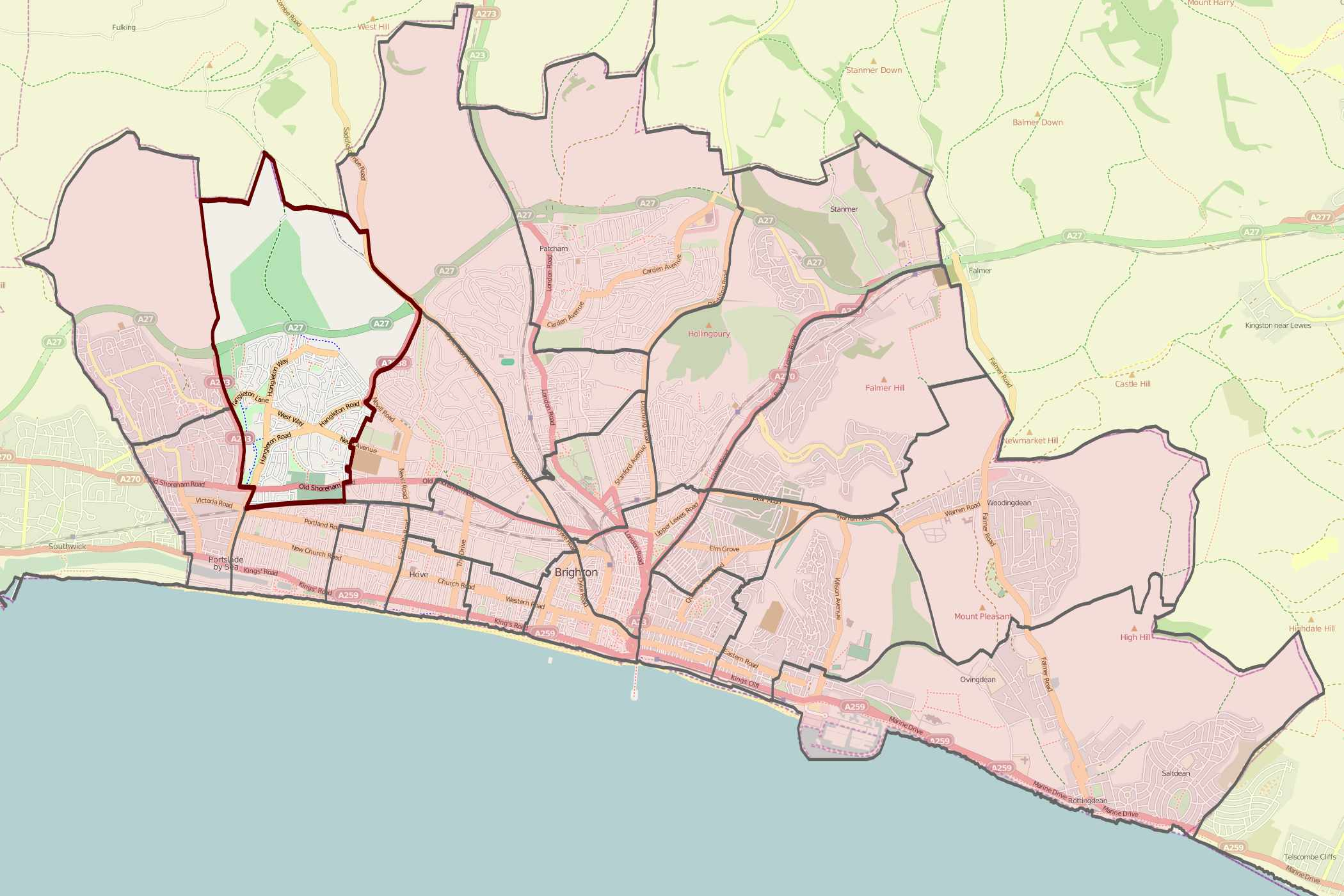
Hangleton and Knoll highlighted

Hangleton and Knoll (3 seats)
Party	Candidate	Votes	%	±%
Conservative	Dawn Barnett	2,159	45.1	
Conservative	Tony Janio	1,926	40.2	
Conservative	Nick Lewry	1,901	39.7	
Labour	John Hewitt	1,899	39.6	
Labour	Birgit Miller	1,762	36.8	
Labour	Kevin Thomas	1,750	36.5	
Green	Jacqui Cuff	548	11.4	
Green	Lily Worfolk	369	7.7	
Green	Benedict Allbrooke	329	6.9	
UKIP	Steven Richards	285	5.9	
Independent	Stuart Nicholas Bower	249	5.2	N/A
Liberal Democrats	Leah Mooney	214	4.5	
Independent	Henrietta Zita Izso	190	4.0	N/A
Majority		2	0.0	
Turnout		4,814	43.57	−7.06
Rejected ballots		23	0.5	
Registered electors		11,050		
Conservative hold		Swing		
Conservative hold		Swing		
Conservative hold		Swing		

=== Hanover and Elm Grove ===
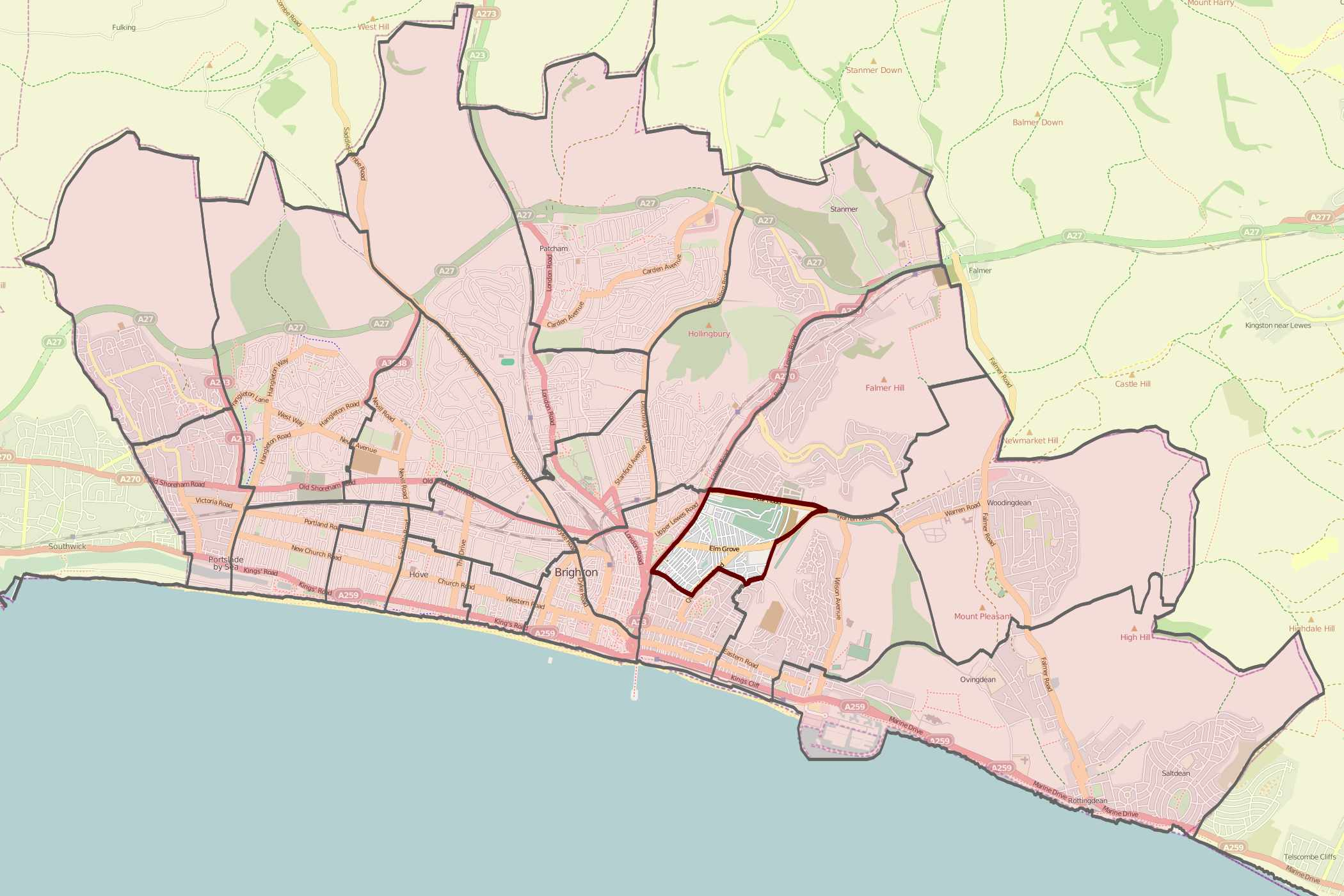
Hanover and Elm Grove highlighted

Hanover and Elm Grove (3 seats)
Party	Candidate	Votes	%	±%
Green	David Gibson	3,332	60.8	
Green	Elaine Hills	3,170	57.9	
Green	Steph Powell	2,267	41.4	
Labour	Emma Daniel	2,133	38.9	
Labour	Danielle Cornish-Spencer	1,657	30.2	
Labour	Eleanor Humphrey	1,400	25.6	
Women's Equality	Beverley Barstow	931	17.0	N/A
Conservative	Ed De Souza	295	5.4	
Liberal Democrats	Elizabeth Robinson	289	5.3	
Conservative	Peter William Goodman	257	4.7	
Conservative	Kerry Ann Underhill	251	4.6	
Majority		134	2.4	
Turnout		5,514	48.15	−13.57
Rejected ballots		36	0.7	
Registered electors		11,452		
Green hold		Swing		
Green hold		Swing		
Green gain from Labour		Swing		

=== Hollingdean and Stanmer ===
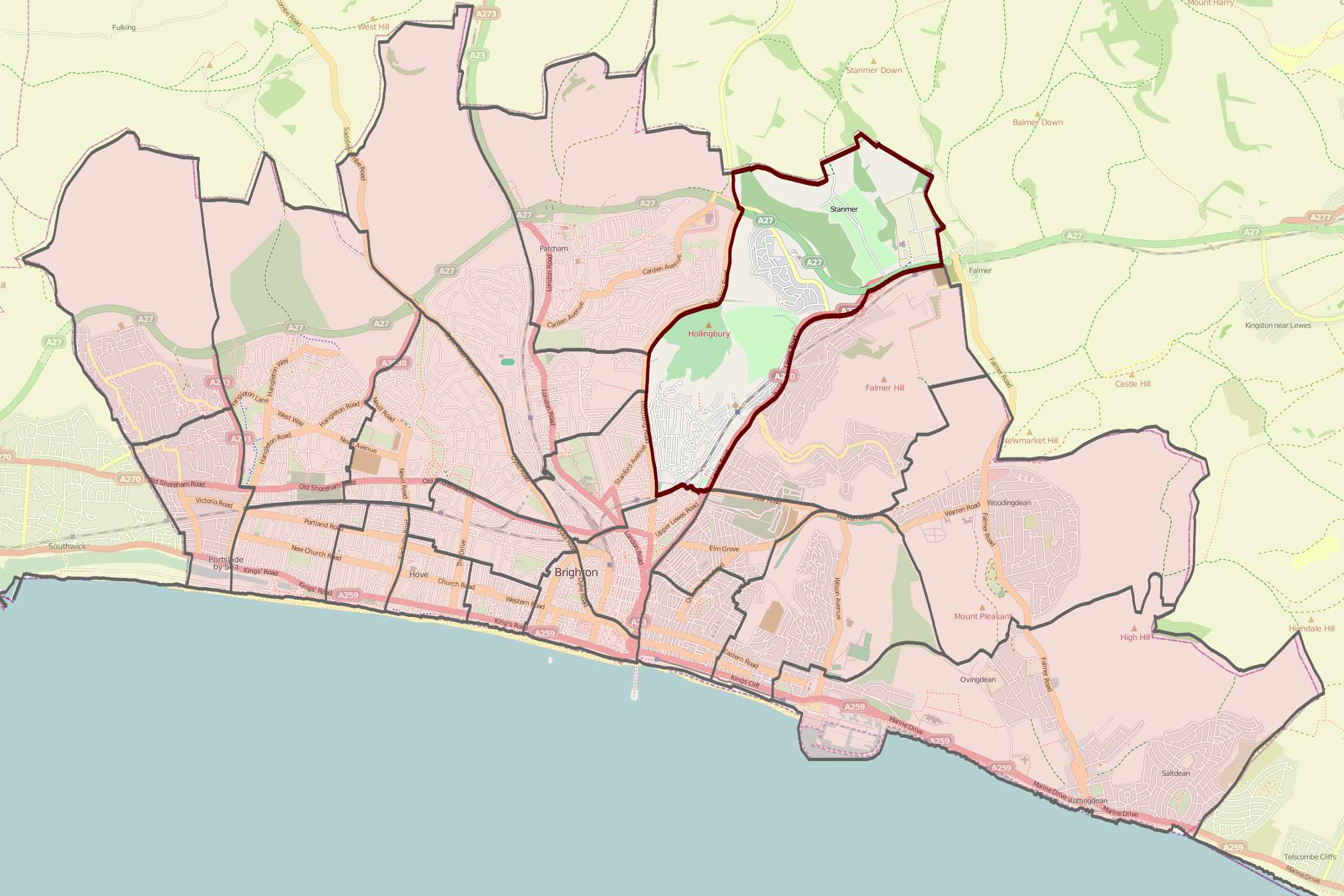
Hollingdean and Stanmer highlighted

Hollingdean and Stanmer (3 seats)
Party	Candidate	Votes	%	±%
Labour	Tracey Hill	1,664	43.7	
Labour	Theresa Fowler	1,512	39.7	
Green	Martin Osborne	1,487	39.0	
Labour	Phillip Clarke	1,431	37.6	
Green	Jack Hazelgrove	1,409	37.0	
Green	Alice Bennett	1,335	35.0	
Conservative	Gary Martin Cohen	414	10.9	
Conservative	Tammi Kim Cohen	390	10.2	
Conservative	Malcolm Murray	373	9.8	
UKIP	Desmond Jones	319	8.4	
Liberal Democrats	Ashley Ridley	228	6.0	
Liberal Democrats	Keith Jago	182	4.8	
Majority		56	1.5	
Turnout		3,830	34.91	−15.65
Rejected ballots		20	0.5	
Registered electors		10,971		
Labour hold		Swing		
Labour hold		Swing		
Green gain from Labour		Swing		

=== Hove Park ===
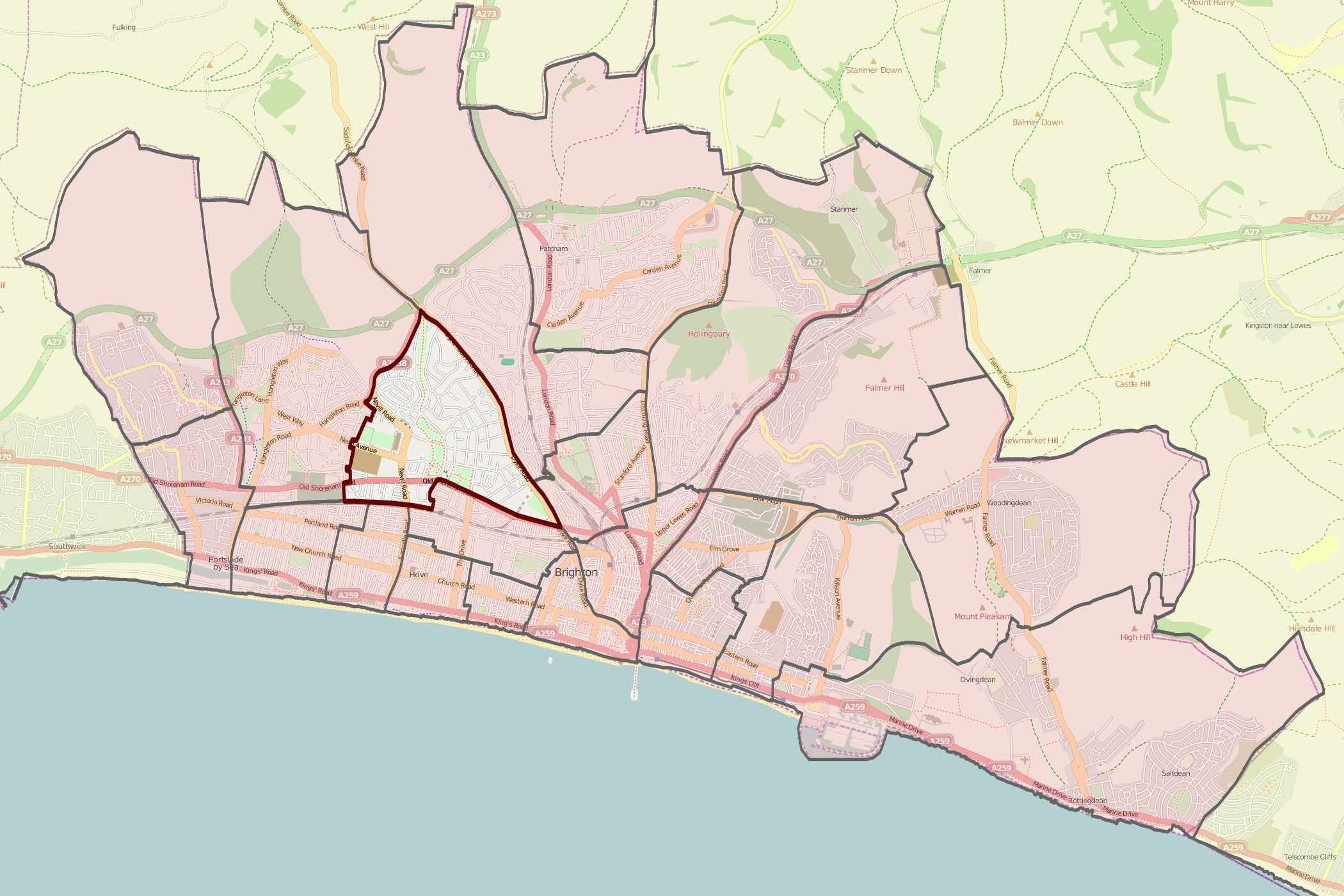
Hove Park highlighted

Hove Park (2 seats)
Party	Candidate	Votes	%	±%
Conservative	Vanessa Brown	1,910	52.1	
Conservative	Samer Bagaeen	1,630	44.4	
Labour	Michael Harrison	1,002	27.3	
Labour	Nigel Jenner	934	25.5	
Green	Iain Martin	567	15.5	
Green	Paul Philo	369	10.1	
Liberal Democrats	Simon Jardine	295	8.0	
Liberal Democrats	Nick O’Shea	270	7.4	
UKIP	Daniel Goodhand	129	3.5	
Majority		628	17.1	
Turnout		3,680	44.20	−7.32
Rejected ballots		12	0.3	
Registered electors		8,325		
Conservative hold		Swing		
Conservative hold		Swing		

=== Moulsecoomb and Bevendean ===
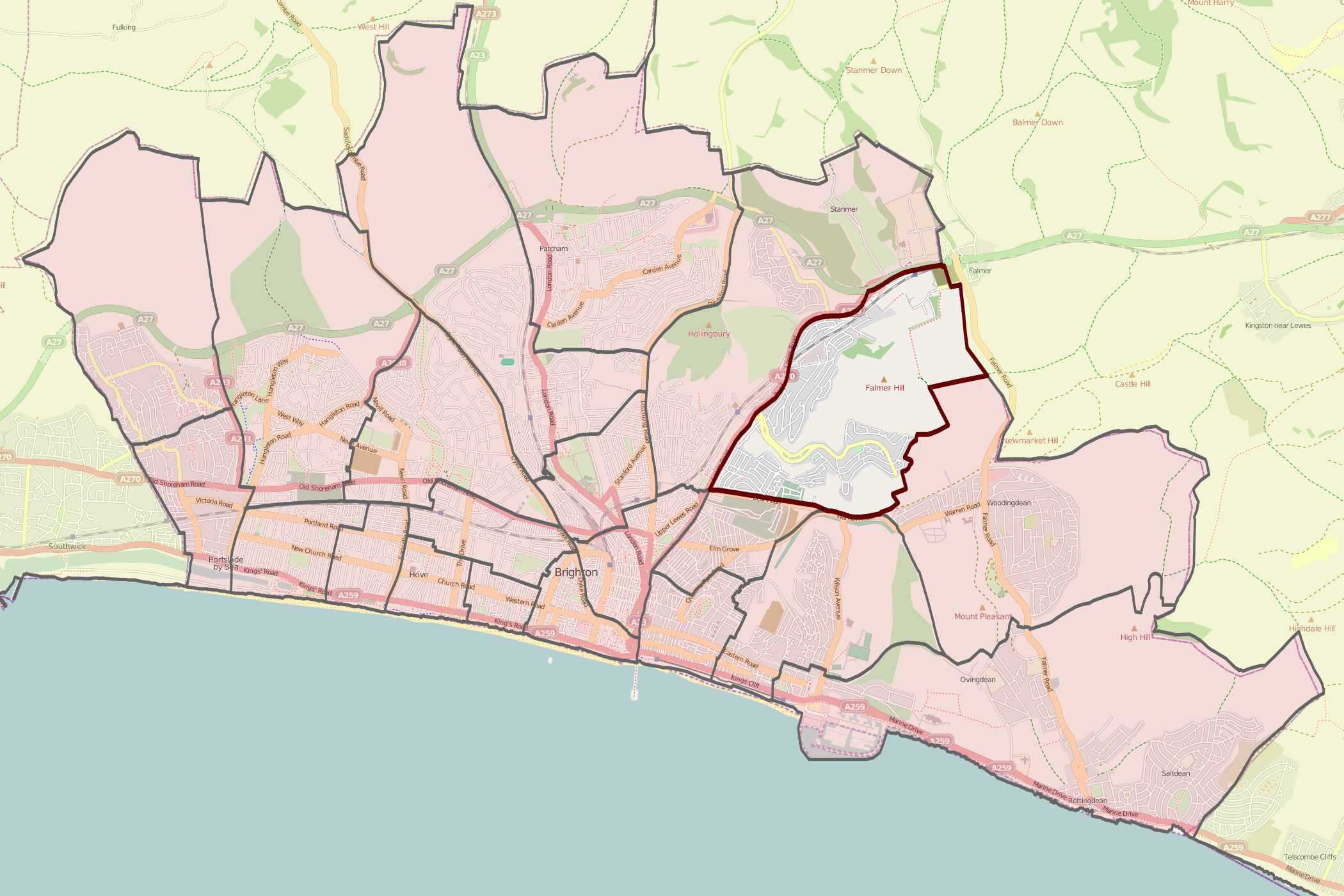
Moulsecoomb and Bevendean highlighted

Moulsecoomb and Bevendean (3 seats)
Party	Candidate	Votes	%	±%
Labour	Daniel Yates	1,540	49.5	
Labour	Amanda Jane Grimshaw	1,527	49.1	
Labour	Kate Knight	1,503	48.4	
Green	Mitchie Alexander	1,063	34.2	
Green	Libby Darling	869	28.0	
Green	Amelia Mills	650	20.9	
Conservative	Anne Christine Meadows	627	20.2	
Conservative	Martin Kenig	580	18.7	
Conservative	Robyn Victoria Simson	544	17.5	
Majority		440	14.2	
Turnout		3,158	27.06	−20.19
Rejected ballots		50	1.6	
Registered electors		11,670		
Labour hold		Swing		
Labour hold		Swing		
Labour hold		Swing		

=== North Portslade ===
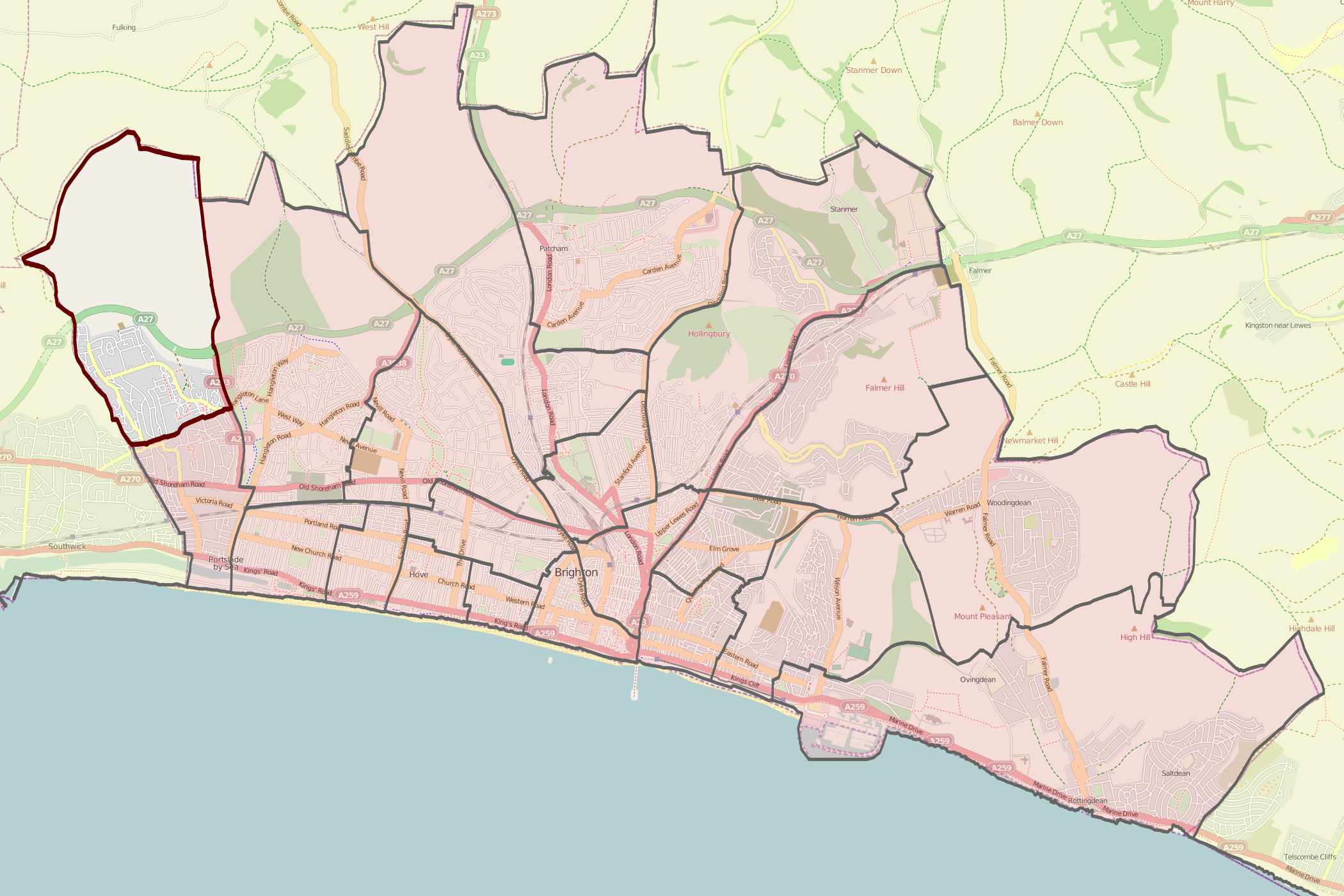
North Portslade highlighted

North Portslade (2 seats)
Party	Candidate	Votes	%	±%
Labour	Peter Atkinson	1,476	55.6	
Labour	Anne Pissaridou	1,171	44.1	
Conservative	Hannah Felton	585	22.0	
Conservative	Emma Louise Hogan	553	20.8	
UKIP	Ian Harris	308	11.6	
UKIP	Patricia Mountain	302	11.4	
Green	Sharon Hamlin	281	10.6	
Liberal Democrats	Elizabeth Craig	163	6.1	
Green	Alexander Sallons	154	5.8	
Majority		586	22.1	
Turnout		2,665	34.86	−15.84
Rejected ballots		8	0.3	
Registered electors		7,645		
Labour hold		Swing		
Labour hold		Swing		

=== Patcham ===
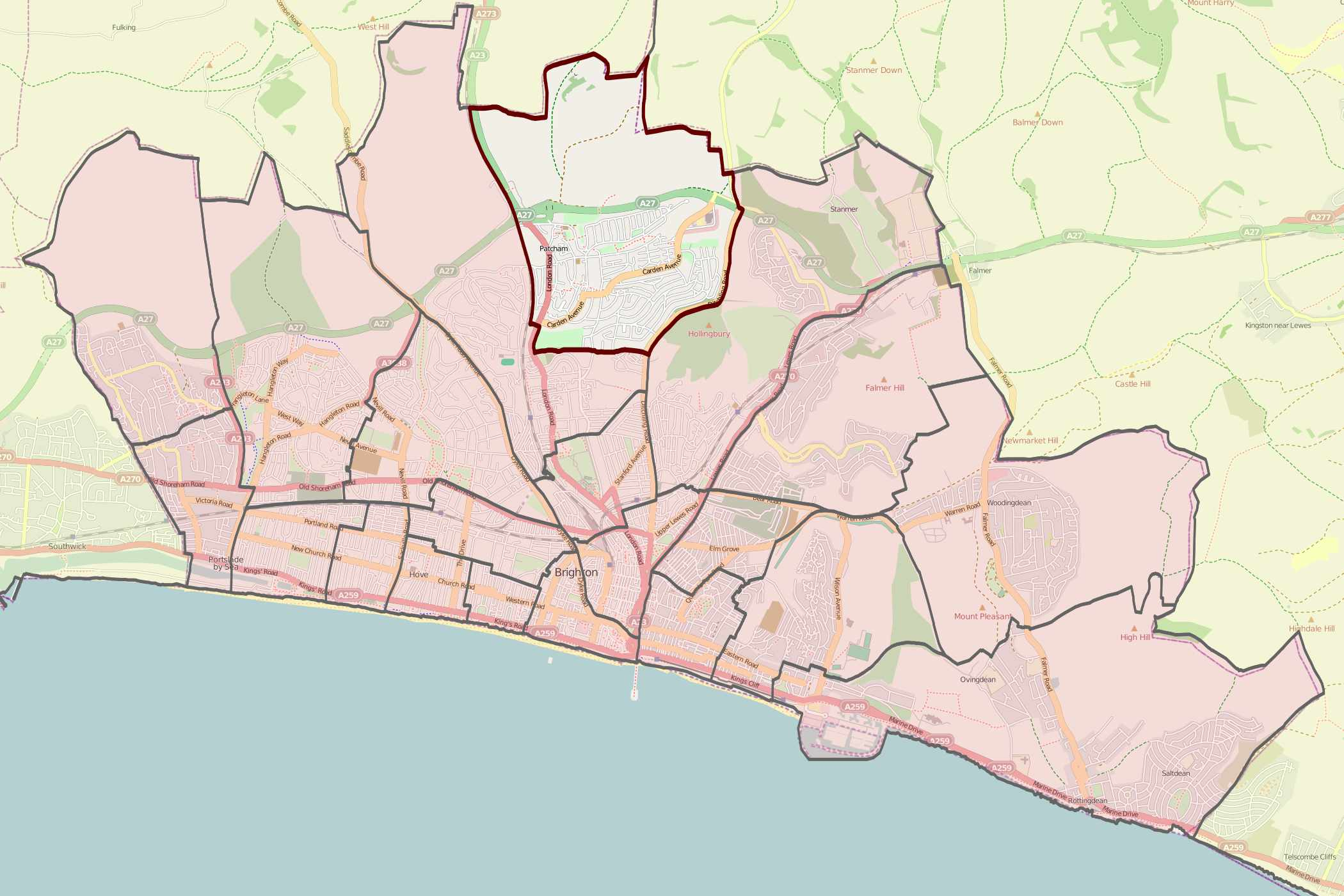
Patcham highlighted

Patcham (3 seats)
Party	Candidate	Votes	%	±%
Conservative	Lee Wares	2,618	51.4	
Conservative	Carol Ann Theobald	2,249	44.1	
Conservative	Alistair McNair	2,044	40.1	
Green	Geraldine Keenan	1,382	27.1	
Labour	Adam John Scott	1,288	25.3	
Labour	Janet Smith	1,279	25.1	
Green	Rebecca Duffy	1,226	24.0	
Labour	Renato Marques	1,197	23.5	
Green	Janaki Jayasuriya	1,026	20.1	
Majority		662	13.0	
Turnout		5,147	46.21	−10.19
Rejected ballots		49	1.0	
Registered electors		11,139		
Conservative hold		Swing		
Conservative hold		Swing		
Conservative hold		Swing		

=== Preston Park ===
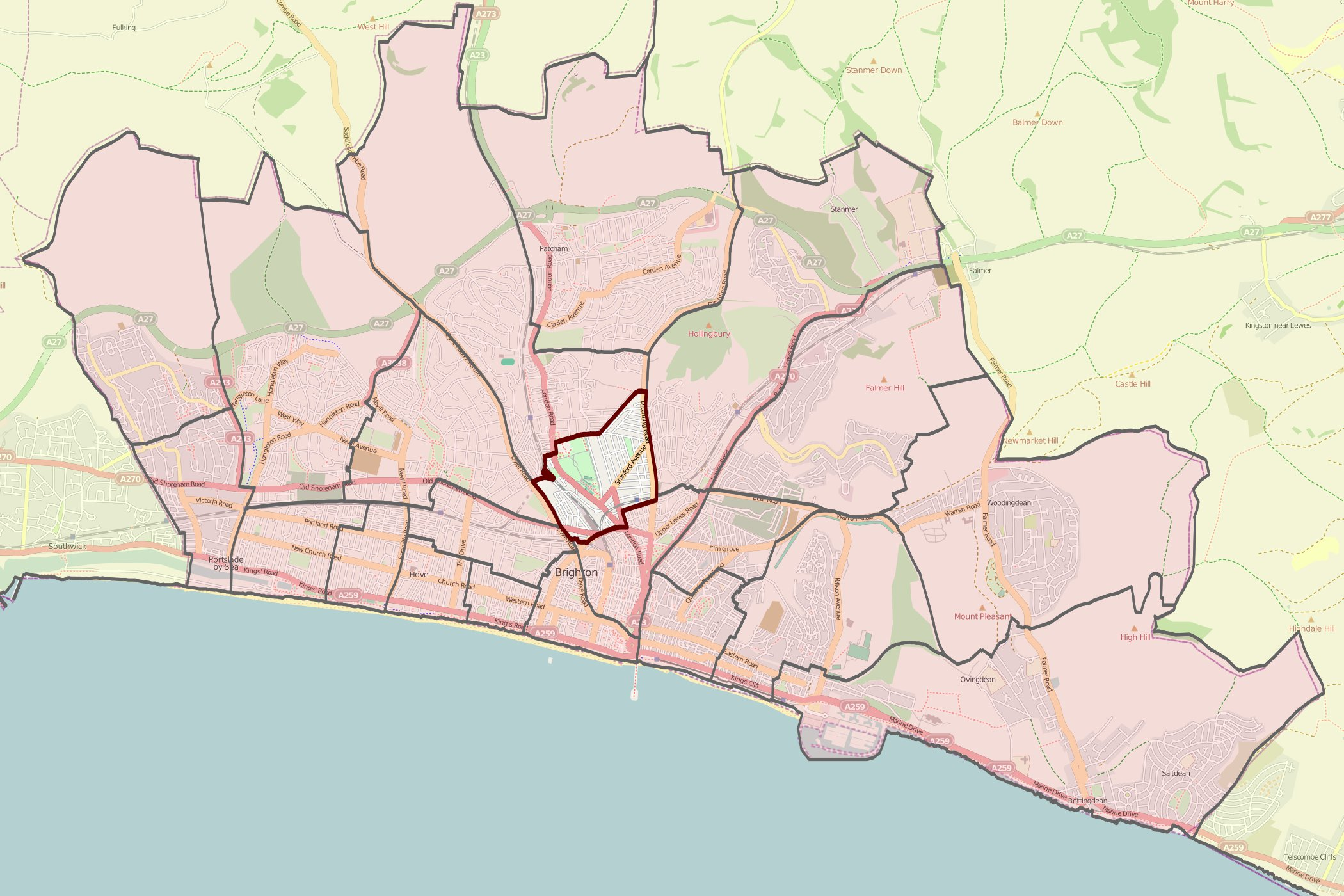
Preston Park highlighted

Preston Park (3 seats)
Party	Candidate	Votes	%	±%
Green	Leo Littman	3,542	60.1	
Green	Amy Heley	3,534	60.0	
Green	Siriol Hugh-Jones	3,377	57.3	
Labour	Julie Cattell	1,905	32.3	
Labour	Juan Baeza	1,638	27.8	
Labour	Denise Friend	1,562	26.5	
Conservative	Sue Ellerton	458	7.8	
Conservative	Mark Watson	430	7.3	
Liberal Democrats	Melanie Hunter-Taylor	385	6.5	
Conservative	Heather Newberry-Martin	383	6.5	
Majority		1,472	25.0	
Turnout		5,924	53.32	−7.32
Rejected ballots		30	0.5	
Registered electors		11,110		
Green hold		Swing		
Green gain from Labour		Swing		
Green gain from Labour		Swing		

=== Queen's Park ===
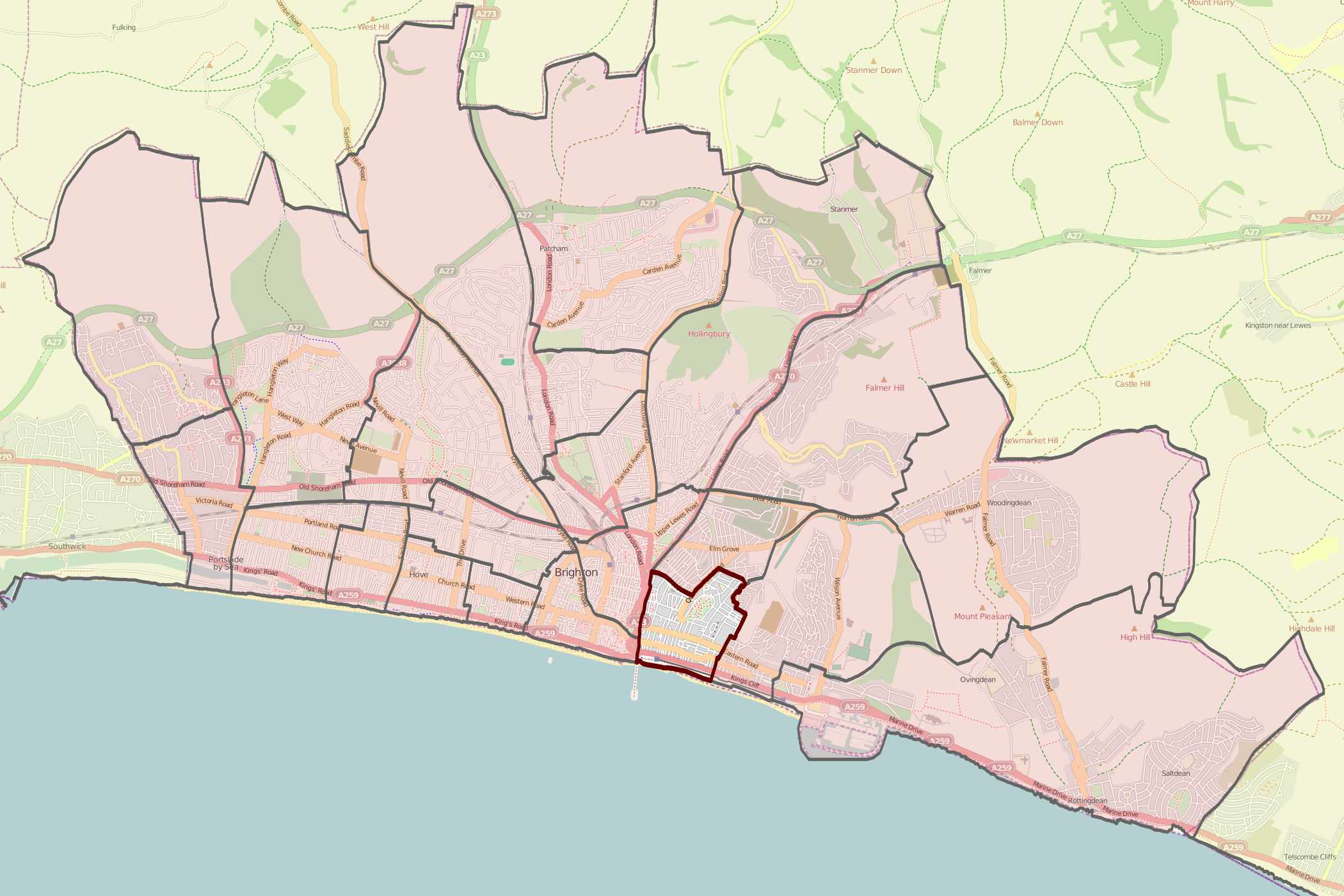
Queen's Park highlighted

Queen's Park (3 seats)
Party	Candidate	Votes	%	±%
Green	Clare Rainey	2,083	43.3	
Labour	Amanda Evans	1,996	41.5	
Labour	Nick Childs	1,894	39.3	
Green	Lucy Agace	1,749	36.3	
Labour	Colin Piper	1,737	36.1	
Green	Martin Farley	1,691	35.1	
Conservative	James Noble	591	12.3	
Conservative	Lee Farmer	574	11.9	
Conservative	Josephine O’Carroll	546	11.3	
Independent	Adrian Guy Hart	500	10.4	N/A
Liberal Democrats	George Taylor	377	7.8	
Majority		145	3.0	
Turnout		4,841	43.08	−7.56
Rejected ballots		27	0.6	
Registered electors		11,236		
Green gain from Labour		Swing		
Labour hold		Swing		
Labour hold		Swing		

=== Regency ===
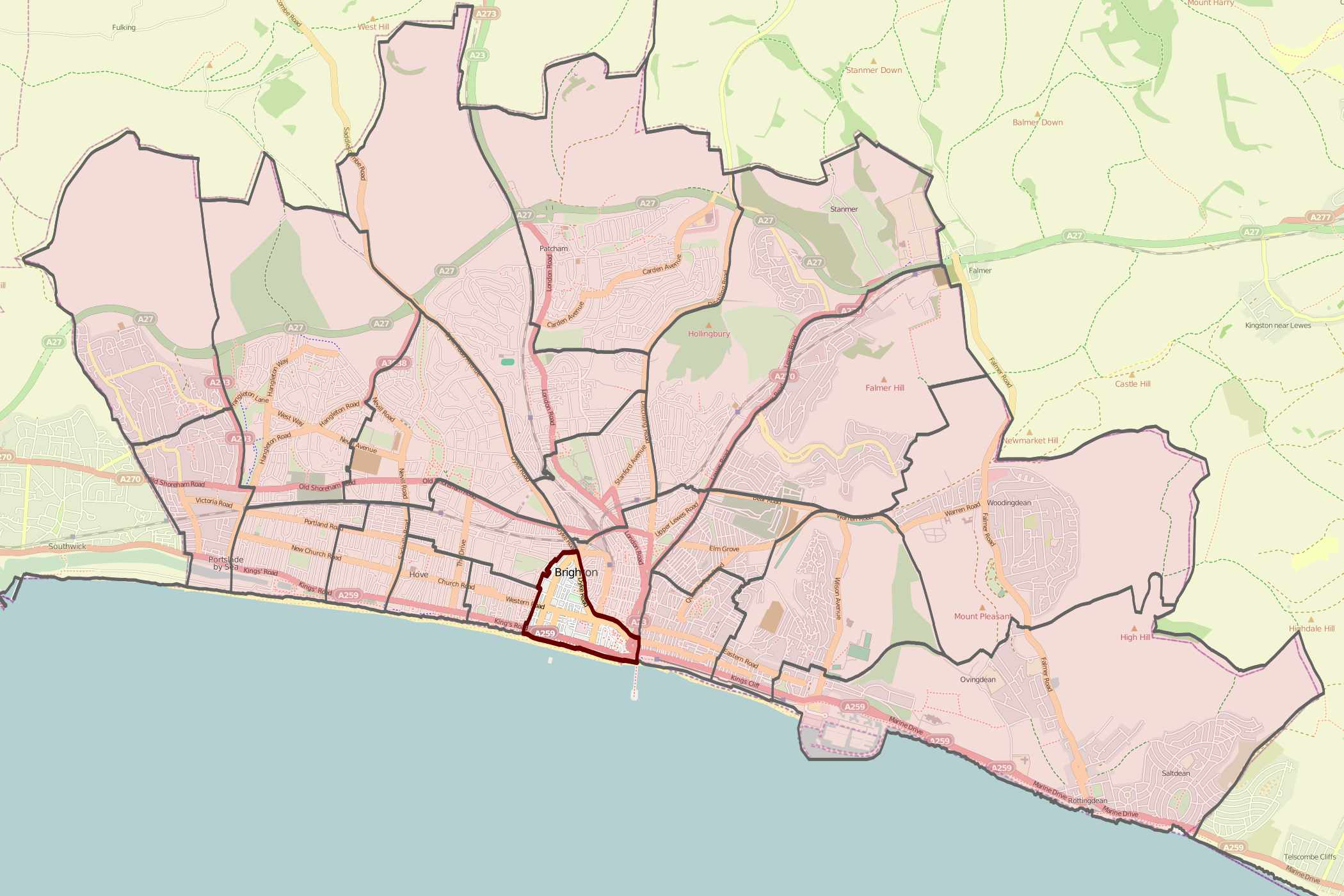
Regency highlighted

Regency (2 seats)
Party	Candidate	Votes	%	±%
Green	Alex Phillips	1,909	65.5	
Green	Tom Druitt	1,837	63.0	
Labour	Poppy Burt	684	23.5	
Labour	Dan Simmonds	492	16.9	
Conservative	Tim Catt	329	11.3	
Conservative	John Kapp	274	9.4	
Liberal Democrats	Laurence Eke	195	6.7	
Majority		1,153	39.6	
Turnout		2,934	39.19	−12.66
Rejected ballots		19	0.6	
Registered electors		7,487		
Green hold		Swing		
Green hold		Swing		

=== Rottingdean Coastal ===
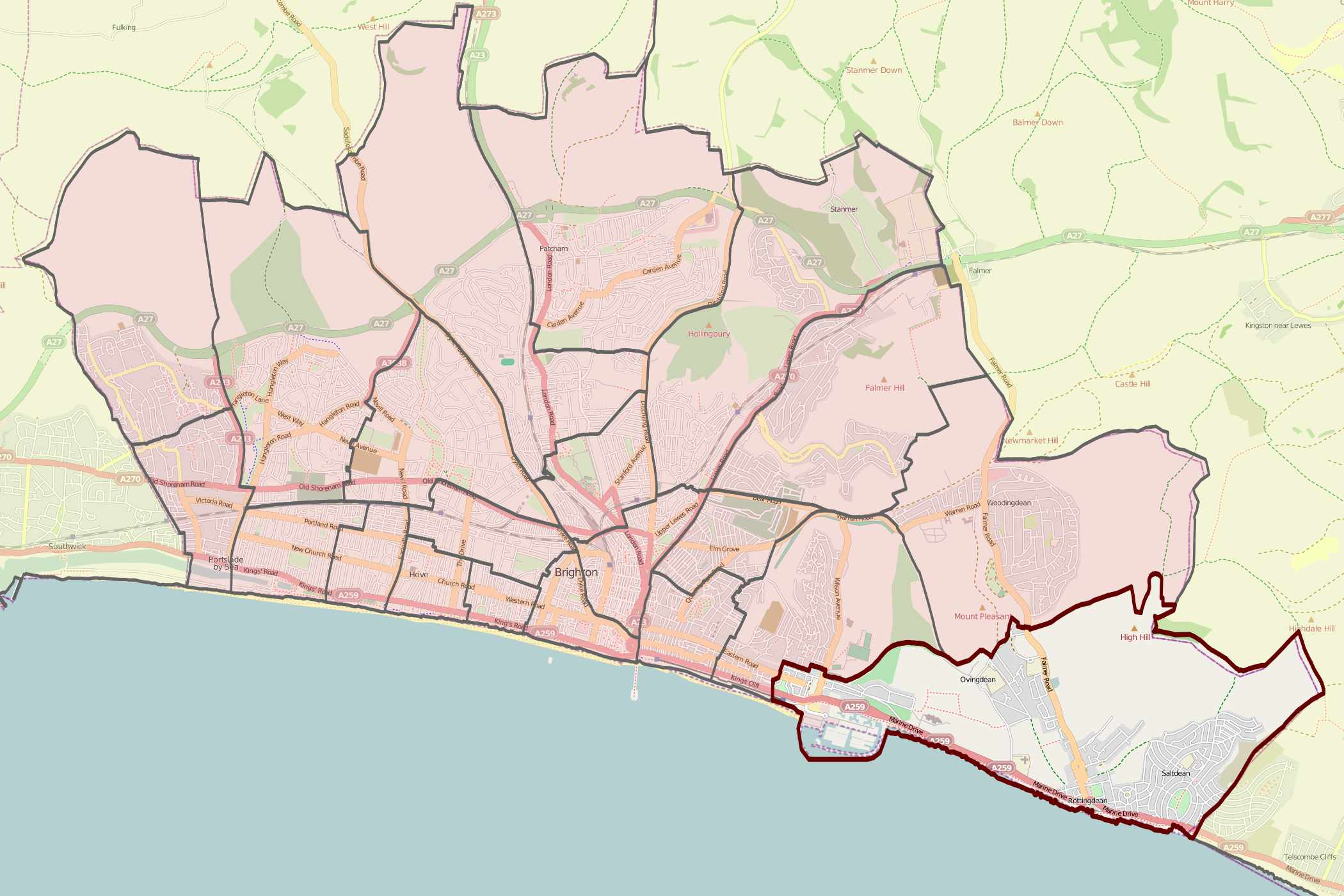
Rottingdean Coastal highlighted

Rottingdean Coastal (3 seats)
Party	Candidate	Votes	%	±%
Independent	Bridget Helen Fishleigh	1,932	37.8	N/A
Conservative	Mary Mears	1,784	34.9	
Conservative	Joe Miller	1,666	32.6	
Conservative	David Plant	1,421	27.8	
Labour	Paul Christopher Johnson	1,321	25.9	
Labour	Jane Chetwynd-Appleton	1,315	25.7	
Labour	Robert McIntosh	1,203	23.6	
Green	Ruby Jackson-Hall	1,088	21.3	
Liberal Democrats	Lucy Catherine Curle	762	14.9	
Green	Florence Traini-Cobb	670	13.1	
Liberal Democrats	Simon Kenneth Gamble	500	9.8	N/A
Green	Matt Traini-Cobb	430	8.4	
Majority		245	4.8	
Turnout		5,129	45.85	−8.69%
Rejected ballots		21	0.4	
Registered electors		11,187		
Independent gain from Conservative		Swing		
Conservative hold		Swing		
Conservative hold		Swing		

=== South Portslade ===
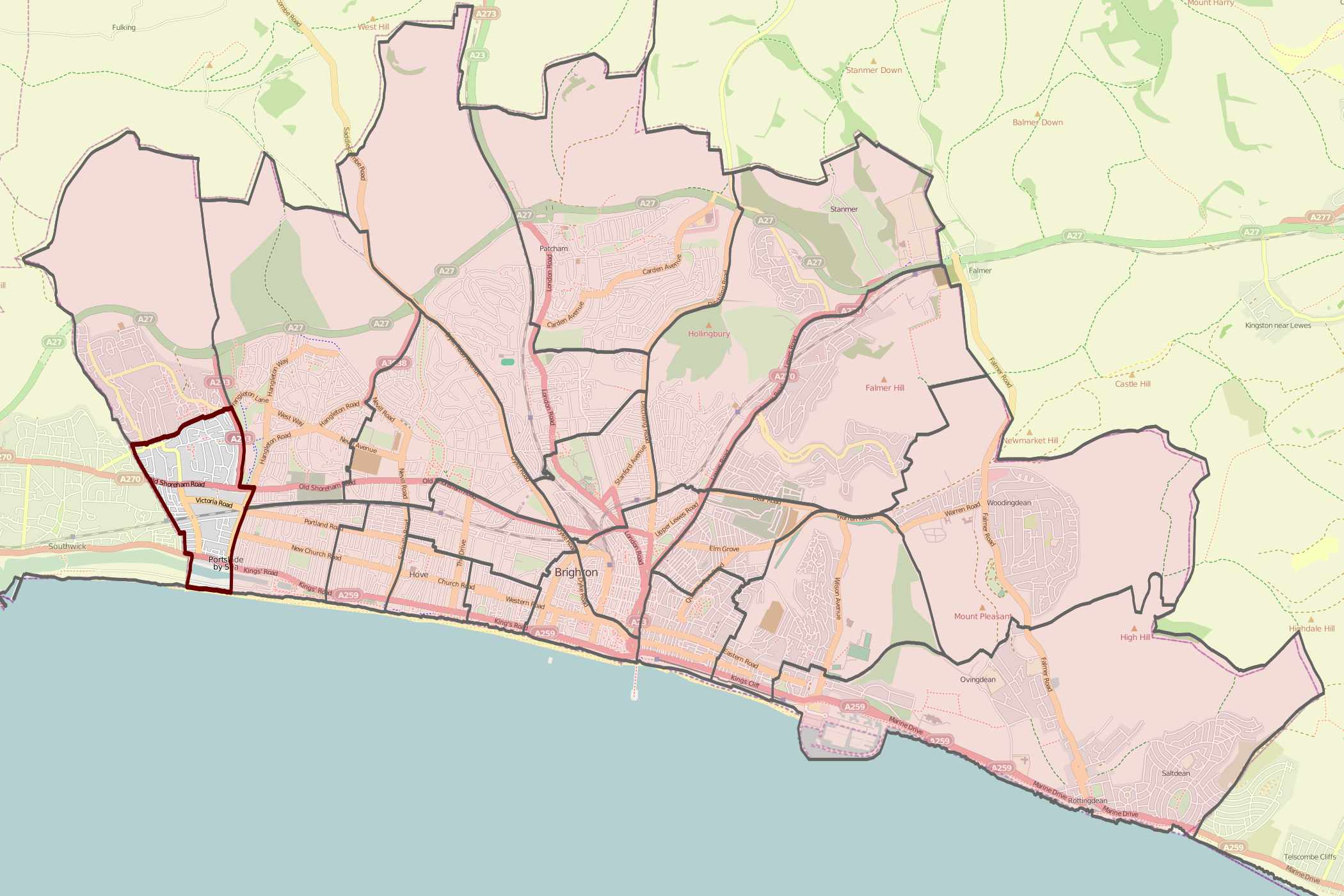
South Portslade highlighted

South Portslade (2 seats)
Party	Candidate	Votes	%	±%
Labour	Leslie Hamilton	1,467	55.9	
Labour	Alan Robins	1,317	50.2	
Conservative	Jamie Gillespie	454	17.3	
Green	Fiona Bennett	453	17.3	
Conservative	Danielle Harmer-Strange	375	14.3	
Green	Simon Gulliver	254	9.7	
Liberal Democrats	Ken Rist	252	9.6	
UKIP	Kenneth Nightingale	241	9.2	
Liberal Democrats	Marjorie Leeds	208	7.9	
Majority		863	32.9	
Turnout		2,639	36.03	−17.65
Rejected ballots		15	0.6	
Registered electors		7,324		
Labour hold		Swing		
Labour hold		Swing		

=== St Peter's and North Laine ===
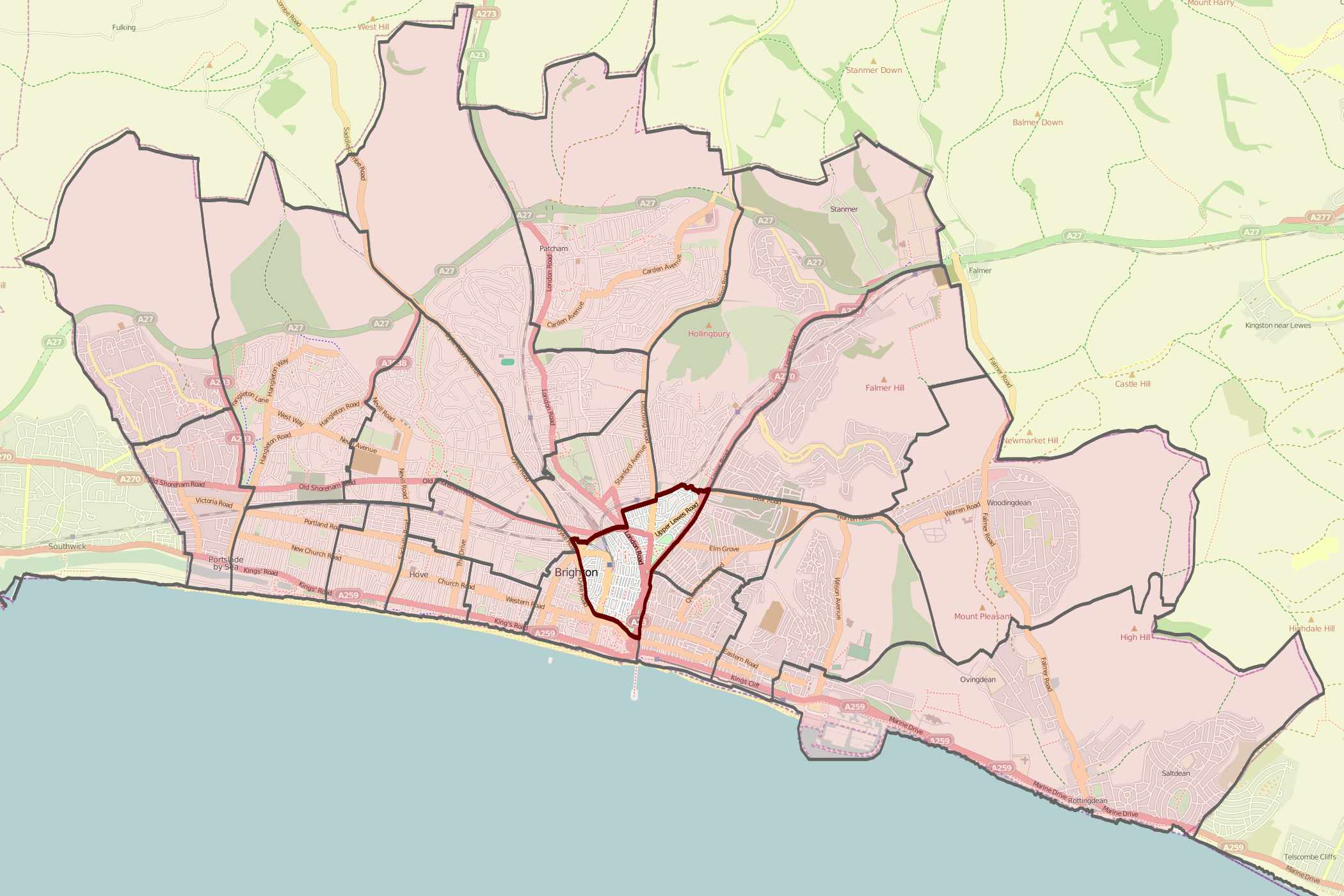
St Peter's and North Laine highlighted

St Peter's and North Laine (3 seats)
Party	Candidate	Votes	%	±%
Green	Lizzie Deane	3,655	71.7	
Green	Sue Shanks	3,348	65.6	
Green	Pete West	3,252	63.8	
Labour	Maureen Elizabeth Winder	1,050	20.6	
Labour	Daniel Thomas Gray	1,018	20.0	
Labour	Gabriel McCook	1,018	20.0	
Liberal Democrats	Rob Heale	399	7.8	
Conservative	Nick Garside	323	6.3	
Conservative	Mike Long	287	5.6	
Conservative	Linda Mary Murray	279	5.5	
Independent	Gerald O’Brien	184	3.6	N/A
Majority		2,202	43.2	
Turnout		5,136	39.99	−16.53
Rejected ballots		35	0.7	
Registered electors		12,843		
Green hold		Swing		
Green hold		Swing		
Green hold		Swing		

=== Westbourne ===
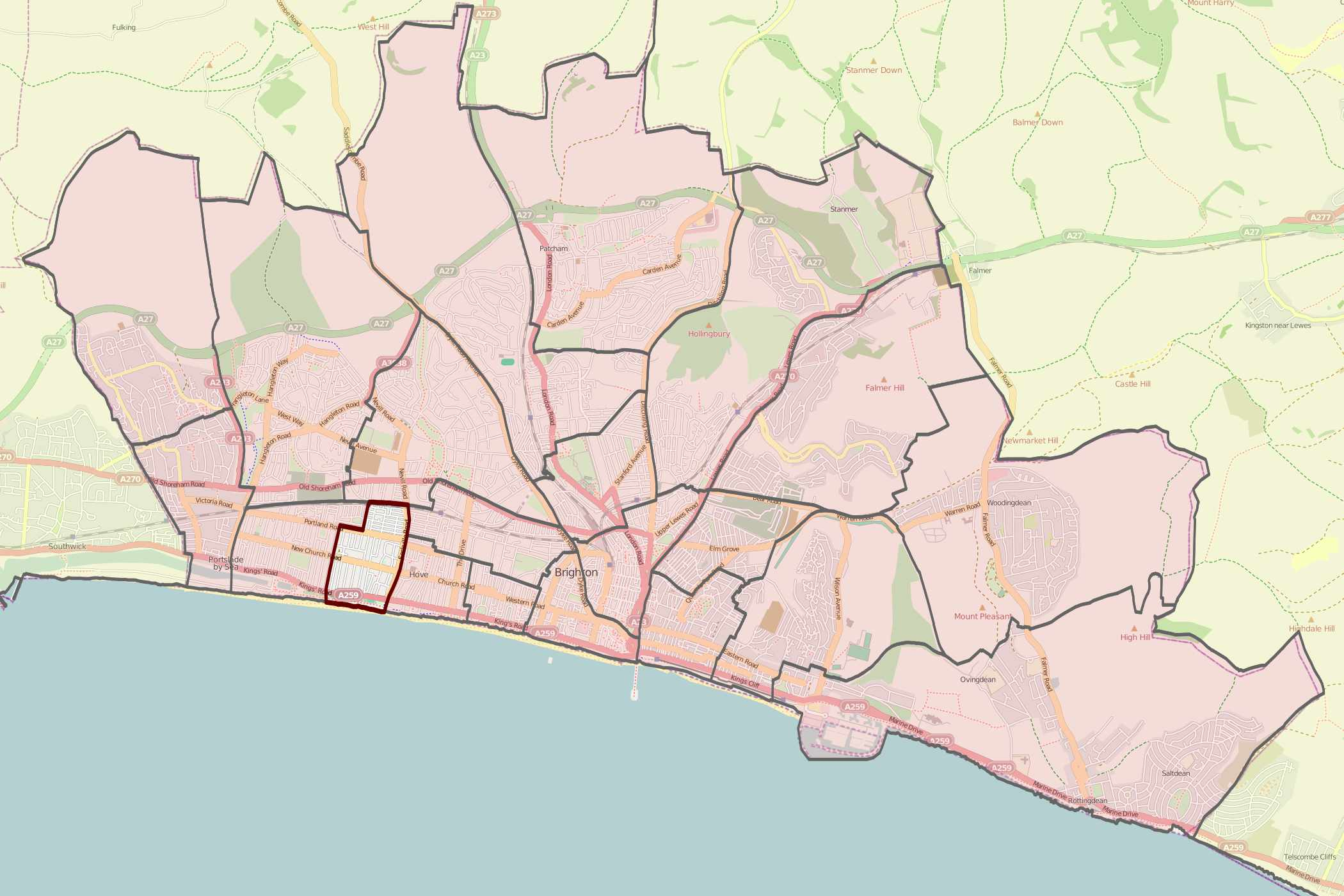
Westbourne highlighted

Westbourne (2 seats)
Party	Candidate	Votes	%	±%
Labour	Carmen Appich	1,457	41.5	
Labour	Chris Henry	1,314	37.4	
Green	Christopher Hawtree	1,073	30.5	
Conservative	Denise Cobb	812	23.1	
Conservative	Charlie Nicholls	746	21.2	
Green	Guy Davidson	733	20.9	
Liberal Democrats	Hilary Ellis	275	7.8	
Liberal Democrats	Geoff Date	252	7.2	
UKIP	Robert Harding	127	3.6	
Majority		241	6.9	
Turnout		3,522	47.98	−7.2
Rejected ballots		8	0.2	
Registered electors		7,340		
Labour hold		Swing		
Labour gain from Conservative		Swing		

=== Wish ===
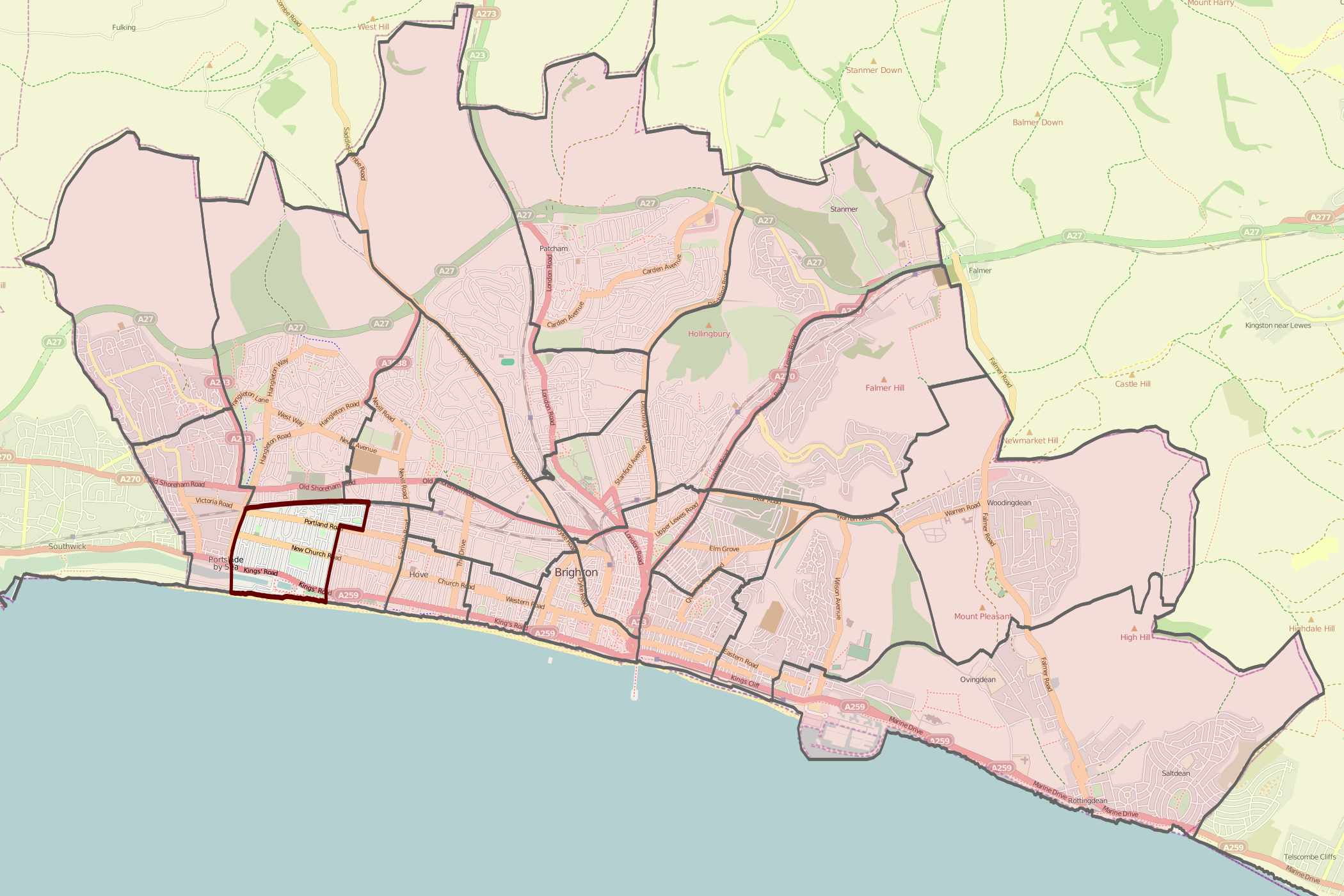
Wish highlighted

Wish (2 seats)
Party	Candidate	Votes	%	±%
Conservative	Robert Nemeth	1,531	41.0	
Conservative	Garry Peltzer Dunn	1,421	38.0	
Labour	Alexandrina Braithwaite	1,275	34.1	
Labour	Adam Imanpour	1,107	29.6	
Green	Andrew Coleman	973	26.0	
Green	Alasdair Howie	521	13.9	
Liberal Democrats	Alfred Emery	262	7.0	
UKIP	Gemma Furness	121	3.2	
Majority		146	3.9	
Turnout		3,758	51.13	−4.9
Rejected ballots		21	0.6	
Registered electors		7,350		
Conservative hold		Swing		
Conservative hold		Swing		

=== Withdean ===
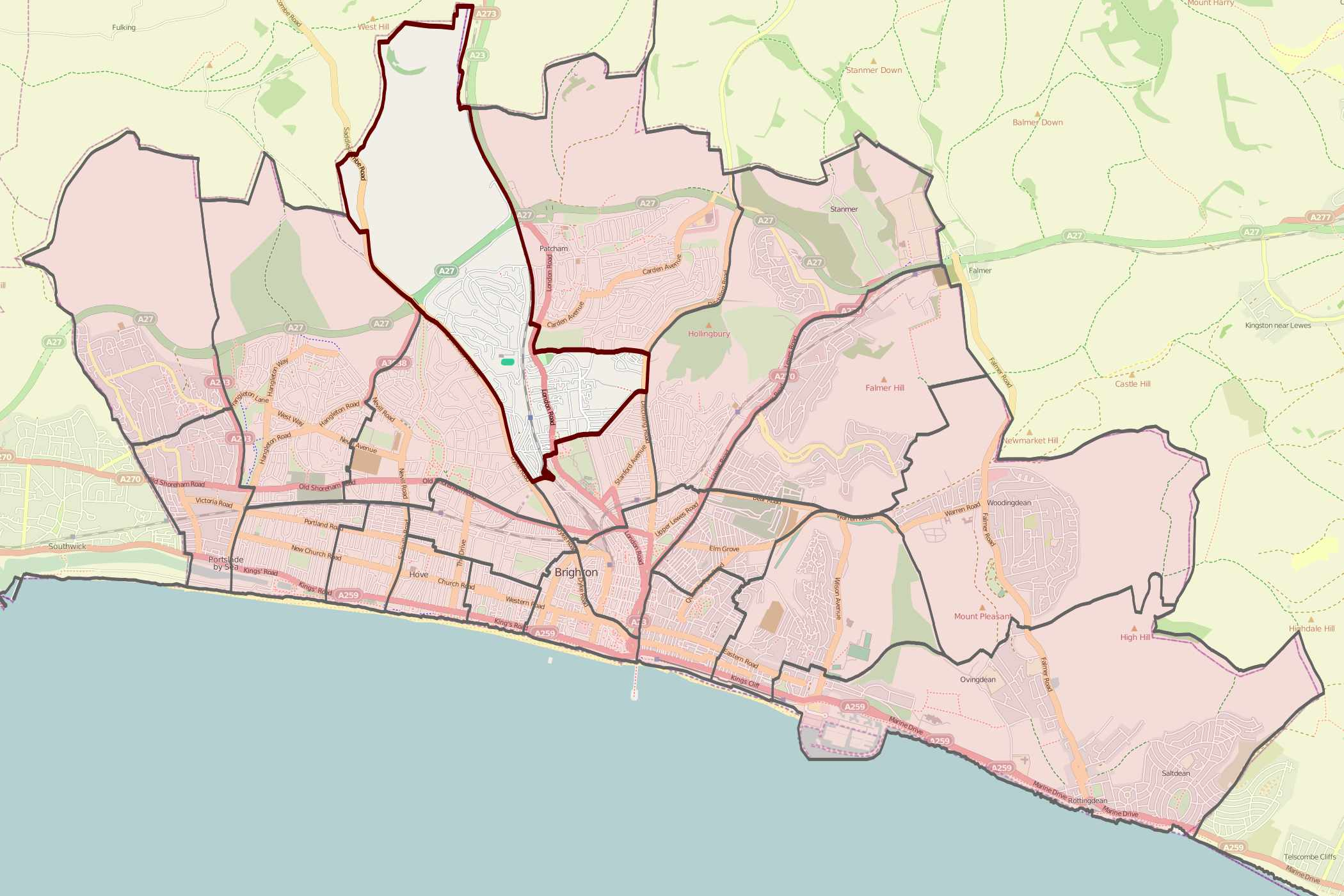
Withdean highlighted

Withdean (3 seats)
Party	Candidate	Votes	%	±%
Green	Sarah Nield	2,791	49.6	
Green	Steve Davis	2,734	48.6	
Green	Jamie Lloyd	2,631	46.8	
Conservative	Tim Hodges	1,535	27.3	
Conservative	Nick Taylor	1,507	26.8	
Conservative	Stephen Wade	1,353	24.1	
Labour	Josh Guilmant	1,263	22.5	
Labour	James Thompson	1,092	19.4	
Labour	Ian McIsaac	1,004	17.8	
Liberal Democrats	Hyder Khalil	431	7.7	
Majority		1,096	19.5	
Turnout		5,667	50.77	−7.73
Rejected ballots		42	0.7	
Registered electors		11,162		
Green gain from Conservative		Swing		
Green gain from Conservative		Swing		
Green gain from Conservative		Swing		

=== Woodingdean ===
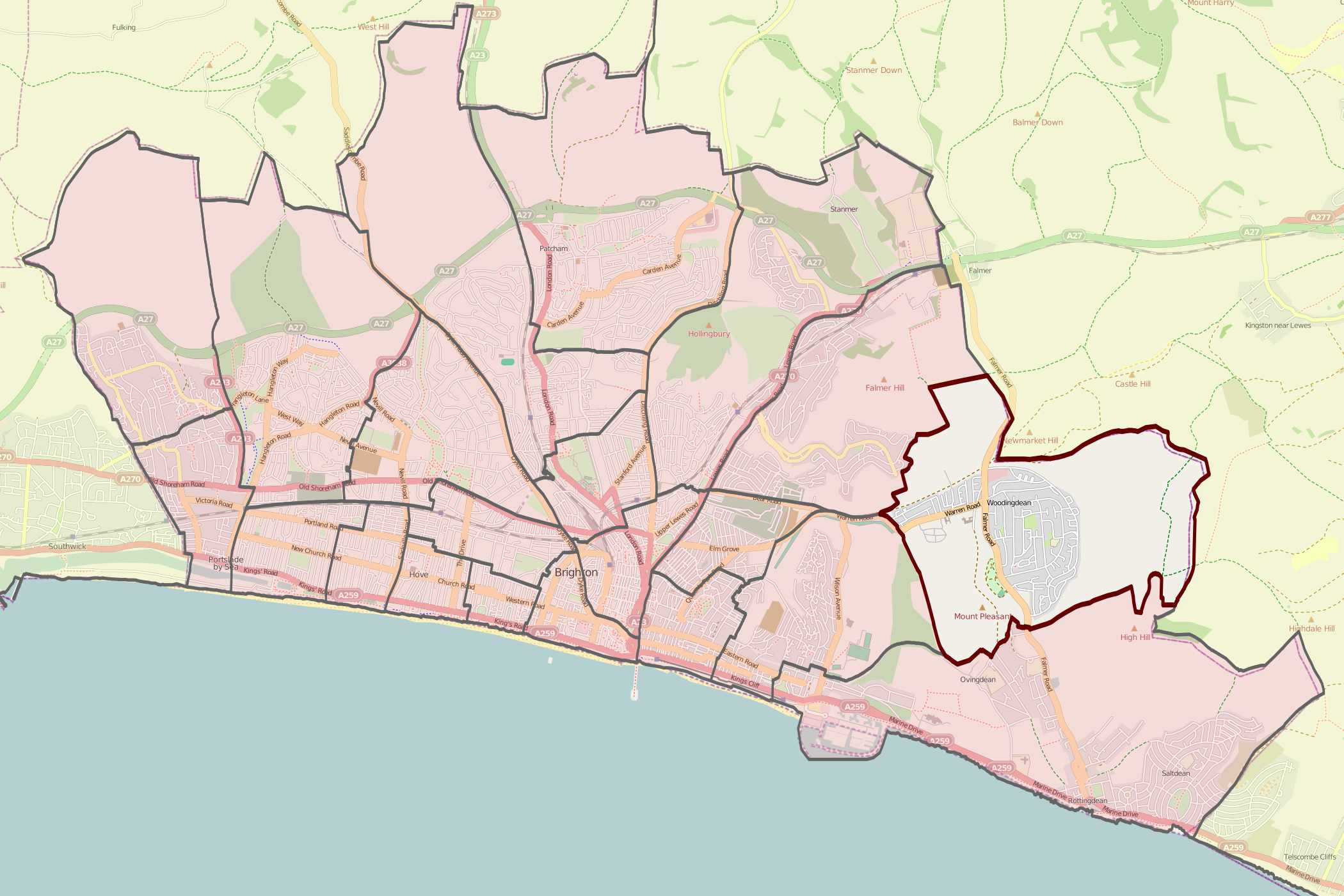
Woodingdean highlighted

Woodingdean (2 seats)
Party	Candidate	Votes	%	±%
Conservative	Dee Simson	1,388	46.2	
Conservative	Steve Bell	1,312	43.7	
Labour	Sunny Choudhury	1,239	41.3	
Labour	David Joseph Wilson	1,126	37.5	
Green	Gwyneth Jones	395	13.2	
Green	Cameron Hardie	296	9.9	
Majority		73	2.4	
Turnout		3,039	40.39	−13
Rejected ballots		37	1.2	
Registered electors		7,524		
Conservative hold		Swing		
Conservative hold		Swing		

== Changes 2019–2023 ==
- In October 2019, Tony Janio, councillor for Hangleton and Knoll and former leader of the Conservative group, left the Conservative Party to sit as an independent.
- In July 2020, the Greens took minority control of the council after Labour councillors Kate Knight (Moulsecoomb and Bevendean) and Nichole Brennan (East Brighton) resigned from the party and Anne Pissaridou (North Portslade) was suspended, over alleged antisemitism in social media posts. Green councillor Phélim Mac Cafferty became leader of the council.
- In August 2021, Peter Atkinson, councillor for North Portslade, resigned from the Labour Party in protest at Pissaridou being readmitted to the party, and sat as an independent.
- Pissaridou's suspension was lifted in August 2021 and she rejoined the Labour group in February 2022, but she was suspended by Labour again in April 2022.
- In August 2022, Labour expelled Pissaridou and Nick Childs, councillor for Queen's Park, for belonging to a proscribed organisation; both sat as independents.

=== By-elections ===
==== Hollingdean & Stanmer ====
The Hollingdean & Stanmer by-election was triggered by the resignation of Labour councillor Tracey Hill.

Hollingdean & Stanmer by-election, 6 May 2021
Party	Candidate	Votes	%	±%
Green	Zoë John	1,542	41.6	▲15.2
Labour	Leila Erin-Jenkins	1,262	34.0	▲9.2
Conservative	Emma Dawson-Bowling	745	20.1	▼4.7
TUSC	Rob Somerton-Jones	54	1.5	N/A
Liberal Democrats	Alex Hargreaves	47	1.3	N/A
UKIP	Des Jones	35	0.9	▼0.4
Independent	Nigel Furness	24	0.6	N/A
Majority		280	7.5	
Turnout		3,756	31.9	▼13.0
Rejected ballots		47	1.3	
Registered electors		11,758		
Green gain from Labour		Swing		

==== Patcham ====
The Patcham by-election was called following the resignation of Conservative councillor Lee Wares.

Patcham by-election, 6 May 2021
Party	Candidate	Votes	%	±%
Conservative	Anne Meadows	2,011	41.5	▼8.0
Green	Eliza Wyatt	1,733	35.8	▲9.6
Labour	Bruno de Oliveira	879	18.1	▼6.2
Liberal Democrats	Madelaine Hunter-Taylor	174	3.6	N/A
UKIP	Charles Goodhand	50	1.0	N/A
Majority		278	5.7	
Turnout		4,874	43.8	▼2.4
Registered electors		11,106		
Conservative hold		Swing	▼8.9	

==== Rottingdean Coastal ====
The Rottingdean Coastal by-election followed the resignation of Conservative councillor Joe Miller.

Rottingdean Coastal by-election, 5 May 2022
Party	Candidate	Votes	%	±%
Labour	Robert McIntosh	1,443	29.6	▲10.4
Independent	Stephen White	1,355	27.8	N/A
Conservative	Lynda Hyde	1,185	24.3	▼1.6
Green	Libby Darling	504	10.3	▼5.5
Independent	Alison Wright	222	4.6	N/A
Liberal Democrats	Stewart Stone	168	3.4	▼7.7
Majority		88	1.8	N/A
Turnout		4,896	44.0	▼1.9
Rejected ballots		19	0.4	
Registered electors		11,124		
Labour gain from Conservative		Swing	▲6.0	

==== Wish ====
The Wish by-election was triggered by the death of Conservative councillor Garry Peltzer Dunn, a former leader of Hove Borough Council and mayor of Brighton and Hove, after a short illness.

Wish by-election, 8 December 2022
Party	Candidate	Votes	%	±%
Labour	Bella Sankey	1,519	58.5	▲27.9
Conservative	Peter Revell	756	29.1	▼7.7
Green	Ollie Sykes	190	7.3	▼16.1
Liberal Democrats	Stewart Stone	96	3.7	▼2.6
UKIP	Patricia Mountain	34	1.3	▼1.6
Majority		763	29.4	N/A
Turnout		2,600	34.2	▼16.9
Rejected ballots		5	0.2	
Registered electors		7,593		
Labour gain from Conservative		Swing	▲17.8	

== See also ==
- Brighton and Hove City Council elections
