= 2012 Green Party of England and Wales leadership election =

British political party election

- 1 August 2012 – 3 September 2012
- Turnout: 3,048 (25.1%) ▼0.4 pp
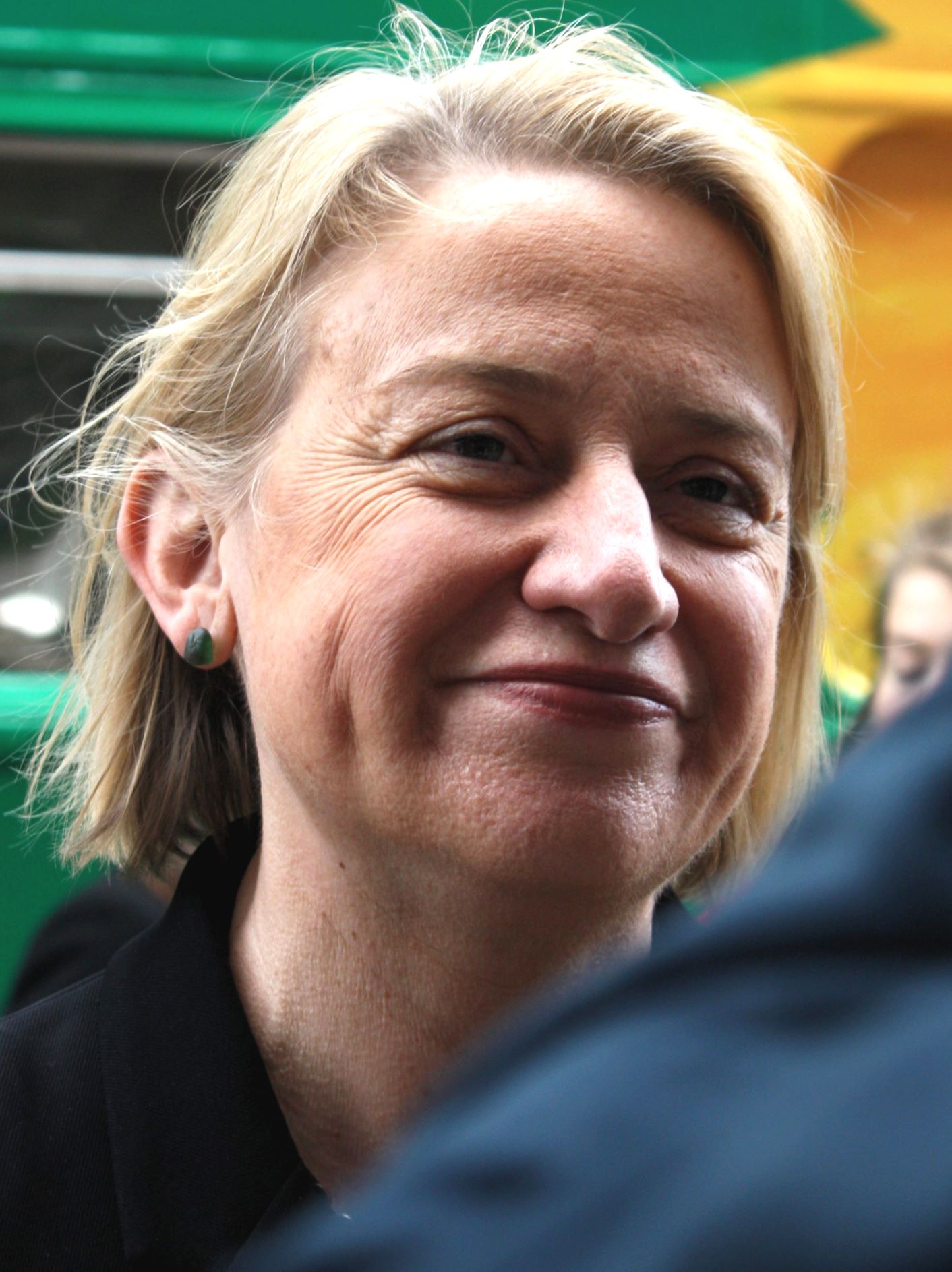

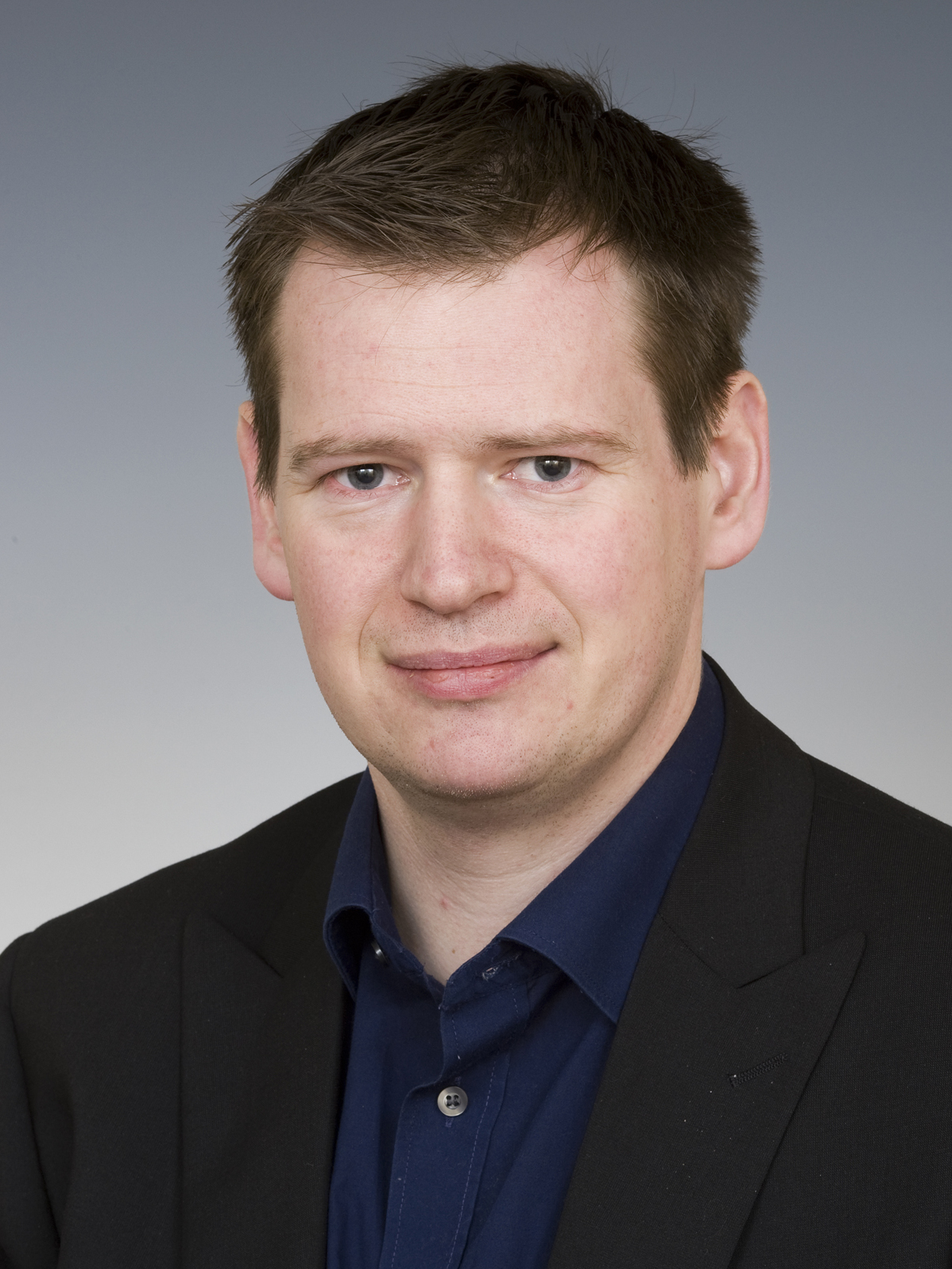

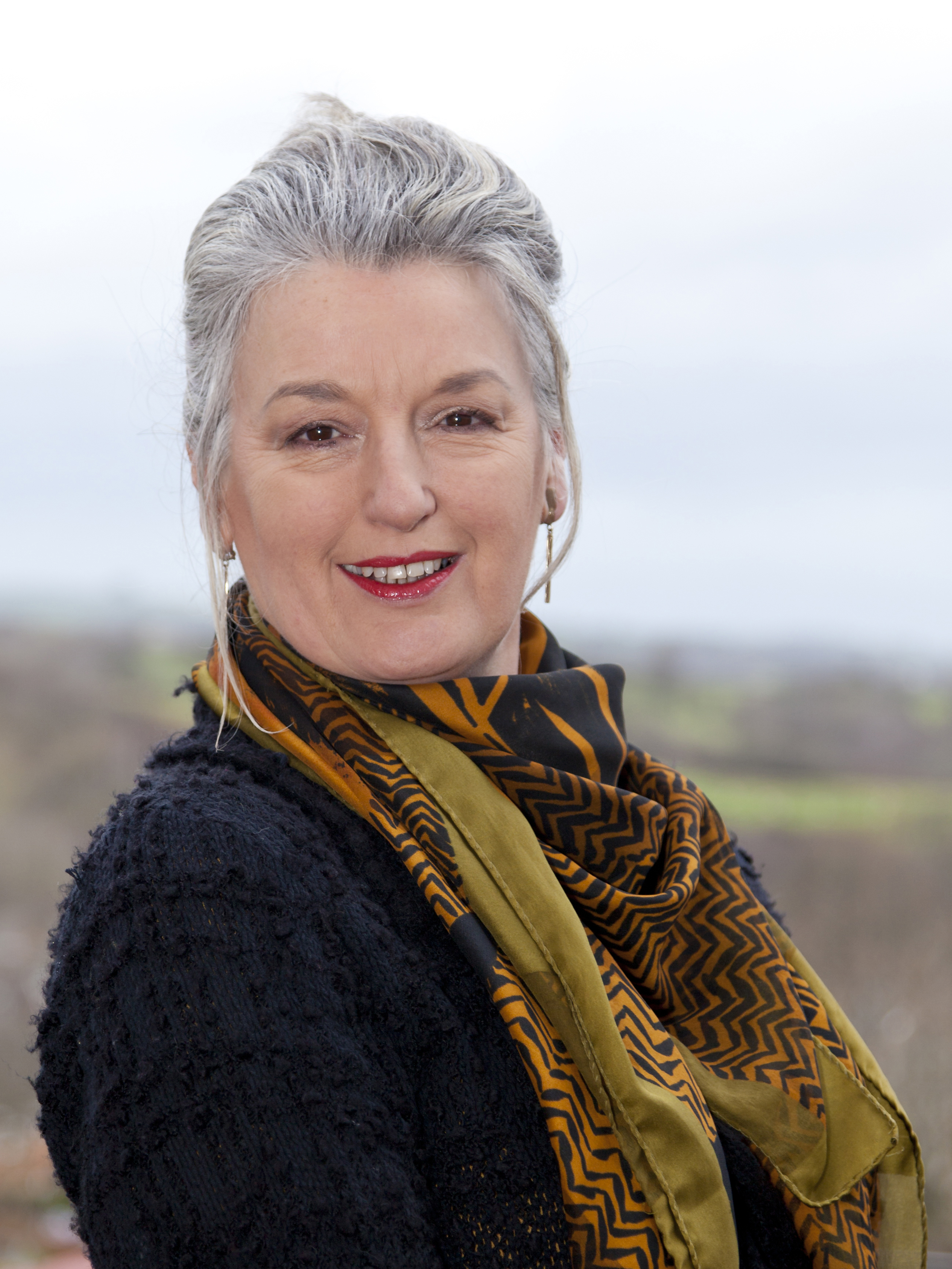
Candidate	Natalie Bennett	Peter Cranie
First pref.	1,300 (41.8%)	902 (29.0%)
Second round	1,487 (48.8%)	976 (32.0%)
Final round	1,757 (59.3%)	1,204 (40.7)
Candidate	Romayne Phoenix	Pippa Bartolotti
First pref.	429 (15.8%)	389 (12.5)
Second round	585 (19.2%)	Eliminated
Final round	Eliminated	Eliminated
Leader before election
Caroline Lucas
Elected leader
Natalie Bennett

The 2012 Green Party of England and Wales leadership election took place in September 2012 to select a leader of the Green Party of England and Wales. The party's incumbent leader, Caroline Lucas, chose not to seek re-election. The position was won by the journalist Natalie Bennett.

== Background ==
The Green Party of England and Wales elects its leaders every two years. Caroline Lucas was elected as the party's first leader in 2008 and had been re-elected unopposed in 2010. In May 2012, she announced that she wouldn't seek re-election.

== Campaign ==
The election was contested by Natalie Bennett, a former journalist for The Guardian.

== Candidates ==
=== Leadership candidates ===
Candidate	Political office
Pippa Bartolotti	Leader of the Wales Green Party (2012–2016)
Natalie Bennett	Internal communications coordinator (2007–2011)
Peter Cranie	
Romayne Phoenix	Chair of the Coalition of Resistance

=== Deputy leadership candidates ===
Candidate	Biography
Caroline Allen	Islington vet
Will Duckworth	Dudley councillor
Richard Mallender	Nottingham councillor
Alexandra Phillips	Brighton and Hove councillor

=== Declined ===
The incumbent deputy leader, Adrian Ramsay, was widely expected to contest the leadership election. However, he announced that he would not stand in that election, nor for re-election as deputy leader.

== Campaign ==
All members of the party were sent ballot papers in the post with their copy of the party's magazine at the beginning of August 2012. Ballots needed to be returned before 31 August 2012.

The result was declared on 3 September 2012. Natalie Bennett was elected leader and Will Duckworth was elected deputy leader.

== Result ==
The results were as follows:

=== Leader ===
Candidate	First round		Second round		Third round	
Candidate	Votes	%	Votes	%	Votes	%
Natalie Bennett	1,300	41.8	1,487	48.8	1,757	59.3
Peter Cranie	902	29.0	976	32.0	1,204	40.7
Romayne Phoenix	429	15.8	585	19.2	Eliminated	
Pippa Bartolotti	389	12.5	Eliminated			
Re-open nominations	28	0.9	Eliminated			

=== Deputy leader ===
Under the election rules operating at the time, the deputy leader could not be of the same gender as the leader. Caroline Allen and Alexandra Phillips were thus eliminated and first preference votes cast for them were redistributed to the highest expressed preference for an eligible candidate. No candidate achieved the necessary quota, but the election rules required that "re-open nominations" not be eliminated, so the candidate with the highest vote was elected.

Candidate	Votes	%
Will Duckworth	1,300	47.9
Richard Mallender	1,245	44.9
Re-open nominations	200	7.2
Caroline Allen	Eliminated	
Alexandra Phillips	Eliminated	

== Aftermath ==
Bennett said she wanted to get MPs elected in every region, setting a target of ten seats.
