= Alex Phillips (Green politician) =

British politician (born 1985)

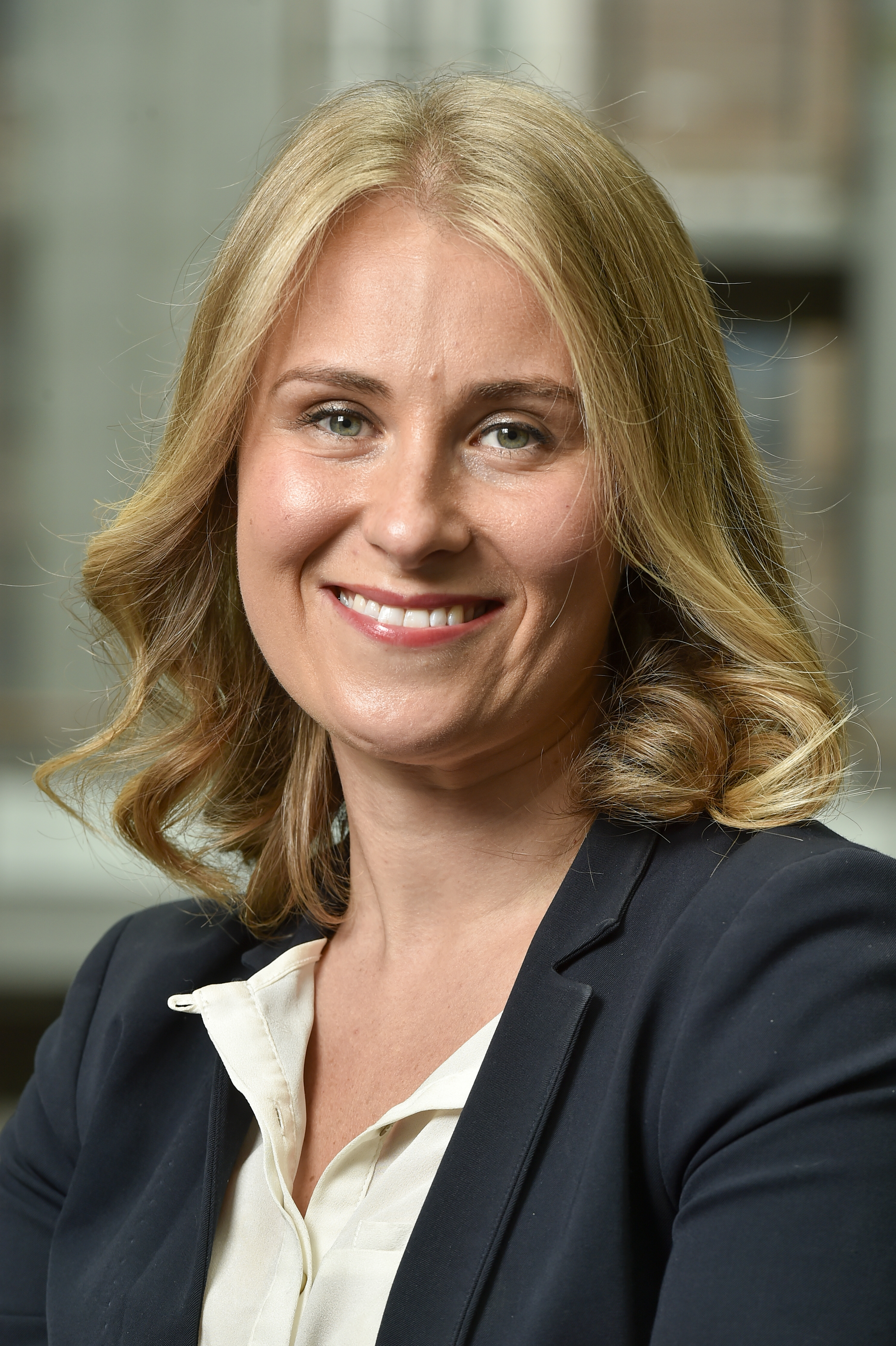
- Phillips in 2019

Member of the European Parliament for South East England
- In office 2 July 2019 – 31 January 2020
- Preceded by: Keith Taylor
- Succeeded by: Constituency abolished

Mayor of Brighton and Hove
- In office 22 May 2019 – 15 May 2020
- Preceded by: Dee Simson
- Succeeded by: Alan Robins

Personal details
- Born: 9 July 1985 (age 41) Liverpool, England, UK
- Party: Green Party of England and Wales (since 2003)
- Other political affiliations: Labour Party (2001–2003)
- Spouse: Tom Druitt
- Children: 2
- Education: University of London Institute in Paris; UCL Institute of Education
- Occupation: Politician

Alexandra Louise Rosenfield Phillips (born 9 July 1985) is a British politician. She served as a Green Party Member of the European Parliament (MEP) for South East England from 2019 to 2020. She was Mayor of Brighton and Hove from May 2019 to May 2020; the youngest person to hold the office. Phillips was a Brighton and Hove City councillor between 2009 and 2023.

== Early life and local political career ==
Phillips was born on 9 July 1985 in Liverpool, Merseyside, to Roger Phillips and Margaret Rosenfield. She is of Jewish heritage. Her father worked as a presenter for BBC Radio Merseyside for 42 years before retiring in 2020. Her younger sister, Ellie Phillips, works as a television presenter and journalist.

Brought up in Liverpool, Phillips was initially a Labour Party activist with her mother, joining the party at the age of 16. In 2003 she resigned from Labour and joined the Green Party as a result of the then Labour government's decision to invade Iraq. She holds a bachelor's degree in French Studies from the University of London Institute in Paris and a PGCE from the UCL Institute of Education.

Phillips moved to Brighton in 2008. She was elected to represent the Goldsmid ward on Brighton and Hove City Council in a 2009 by-election, and re-elected in 2011. She unsuccessfully stood in the 2012 Green Party of England and Wales deputy leadership election. In subsequent council elections she contested the Regency ward, winning a seat in both 2015 and 2019. She became Brighton's youngest mayor in 2019 after being selected for the role by her fellow councillors. She finished her term as mayor in May 2020. Outside of her council roles, she has worked as the policy lead at the HIV and sexual health charity, Terrence Higgins Trust, and as a French and German language secondary school teacher in Croydon, London, and later Hampshire. In 2022, Phillips announced that she and her husband were stepping down as councillors ahead of the May 2023 elections.

== European Parliament ==
In the 2014 European parliamentary election, Phillips stood as a candidate in the South East England constituency. She was second on her party's list after Keith Taylor (Green Party MEP since 2010). In the election, the Green Party won just one seat in South East England which therefore went to Taylor as their first-placed candidate. Phillips worked as Senior Campaigns Coordinator for Green Party MP Caroline Lucas's successful general election campaigns in 2010 and 2015. She supported the United Kingdom remaining within the European Union (EU) in the 2016 United Kingdom European Union membership referendum.

Phillips contested the 2019 European Parliament election in the South East England constituency. This time she was first on her party's list, Taylor having chosen not to seek re-election. In the same constituency, another candidate called Alexandra Phillips also stood as a candidate but for the Brexit Party. In the election, both were elected as MEPs. In the European Parliament, she was a member of the Committee on Employment and Social Affairs, and part of the delegation to the ACP–EU Joint Parliamentary Assembly.

== House of Commons bid ==
Phillips was the Green Party candidate for Brighton Kemptown at the 2019 general election. She finished fourth out of five candidates.

== Personal life ==
Phillips is married to Tom Druitt, a fellow Green Party Brighton and Hove councillor and managing director of The Big Lemon (a bus and coach operator in Brighton). They both hold shares in the company which has a contract with the city council. They have two children.
