= List of electoral wards in East Sussex =

This is a list of electoral divisions and wards in the ceremonial county of East Sussex in South East England. All changes since the re-organisation of local government following the passing of the Local Government Act 1972 are shown. The number of councillors elected for each electoral division or ward is shown in brackets.

== County council ==
=== East Sussex ===
Electoral divisions from 1 April 1974 (first election 12 April 1973) to 2 May 1985:

1. Barcombe (1)
2. Battle (1)
3. Beckley (1)
4. Bexhill (East) (1)
5. Bexhill (North) (1)
6. Bexhill (South) (1)
7. Bexhill (West) (1)
8. Brighton (Elm Grove) (1)
9. Brighton (Falmer) (1)
10. Brighton (Hanover) (1)
11. Brighton (Hollingbury) (1)
12. Brighton (Kings Cliff) (1)
13. Brighton (Lewes Road) (1)
14. Brighton (Montpelier) (1)
15. Brighton (Moulscoomb) (1)
16. Brighton (Patcham) (1)
17. Brighton (Pier) (1)
18. Brighton (Preston Park) (1)
19. Brighton (Preston) (1)
20. Brighton (Queens Park) (1)
21. Brighton (Regency) (1)
22. Brighton (Rottingdean) (1)
23. Brighton (St Nicholas) (1)
24. Brighton (St Peters) (1)
25. Brighton (Stanmer) (2)
26. Brighton (Warren) (2)
27. Buxted & Mayfield (1)
28. Crowborough (1)
29. Cuckmere (1)
30. Ditchling (1)
31. Eastbourne No. 1 (1)
32. Eastbourne No. 2 (Central) (1)
33. Eastbourne No. 3 (Downside) (1)
34. Eastbourne No. 4 (Hampden Park) (1)
35. Eastbourne No. 5 (Langney) (1)
36. Eastbourne No. 6 (Meads) (1)
37. Eastbourne No. 7 (Ratton) (1)
38. Eastbourne No. 8 (Roselands) (1)
39. Eastbourne No. 9 (Upperton) (1)
40. Forest Row (1)
41. Hailsham (1)
42. Hastings No. 1 (All Saints & St Cl (1)
43. Hastings No. 2 (St Helens & St Mary in the C (2)
44. Hastings No. 3 (Hollington) (1)
45. Hastings No. 4 (Holy Trinity) (1)
46. Hastings No. 5 (St Leonards) (1)
47. Hastings No. 6 (St Mary-in-the-Cas (1)
48. Hastings No. 7 (St Mary Magdalen) (1)
49. Hastings No. 8 (St Peters) (1)
50. Heathfield (1)
51. Hellingly (1)
52. Hove (Adelaide) (1)
53. Hove (Brunswick) (1)
54. Hove (Goldsmid) (1)
55. Hove (Goldstone) (1)
56. Hove (Hangleton) (1)
57. Hove (Knoll) (1)
58. Hove (Stanford) (1)
59. Hove (Vallance) (1)
60. Hove (Westbourne) (1)
61. Hove (Wish) (1)
62. Lewes (East) (1)
63. Lewes (West) (1)
64. Maresfield (1)
65. Newhaven (1)
66. Peacehaven (1)
67. Pevensey (1)
68. Polegate (1)
69. Portslade (North) (1)
70. Portslade (South) (1)
71. Rye (1)
72. Salehurst (1)
73. Seaford (Blatchington) (1)
74. Seaford (Sutton) (1)
75. Telscombe (1)
76. Ticehurst (1)
77. Uckfield (1)
78. Wadhurst (1)
79. Willingdon (1)
80. Winchelsea (1)
81. Withyham (1)

Electoral divisions from 2 May 1985 to 5 May 2005:

1. Battle (1)
2. Bexhill East (1)
3. Bexhill North (1)
4. Bexhill South (1)
5. Bexhill West (1)
6. Braybrooke & Castle (1)
7. Broomgrove & Ore (1)
8. Brunswick & Adelaide (1); electoral division abolished in 1997
9. Buxted & Maresfield (1)
10. Cavendish (1)
11. Central St Leonards & Gensing (1)
12. Chailey (1)
13. College (1)
14. Crowborough (Beacon) (1)
15. Crowborough (Rothersfield) (1)
16. Forest Row (1)
17. Goldsmid (1); electoral division abolished in 1997
18. Hailsham (1)
19. Hangleton (1); electoral division abolished in 1997
20. Hanover (1); electoral division abolished in 1997
21. Heathfield (1)
22. Hellingly (1)
23. Hollingbury (1); electoral division abolished in 1997
24. Hollington & Ashdown (1)
25. Kings Cliff (1); electoral division abolished in 1997
26. Lewes (1)
27. Marine (1); electoral division abolished in 1997
28. Moulsecoomb (1); electoral division abolished in 1997
29. Nevill (1); electoral division abolished in 1997
30. Newhaven (1)
31. Old Hastings & Mount Pleasant (1)
32. Old Town (1)
33. Park (1)
34. Patcham (1); electoral division abolished in 1997
35. Peacehaven (1)
36. Pevensey (1)
37. Polegate (1)
38. Portslade North (1); electoral division abolished in 1997
39. Portslade South (1); electoral division abolished in 1997
40. Preston (1); electoral division abolished in 1997
41. Princes (1)
42. Priory (1)
43. Queens Park (1); electoral division abolished in 1997
44. Regency (1); electoral division abolished in 1997
45. Ringmer (1)
46. Rottingdean (1); electoral division abolished in 1997
47. Rye (1)
48. Seaford (Blatchington) (1)
49. Seaford (Sutton) (1)
50. Seven Dials (1); electoral division abolished in 1997
51. Silverhill & Wishing Tree (1)
52. St Helens & Elphinstone (1)
53. St Marys (1)
54. St Peters (1); electoral division abolished in 1997
55. Stanford (1); electoral division abolished in 1997
56. Stanmer (1); electoral division abolished in 1997
57. Telscombe (1)
58. Tenantry (1); electoral division abolished in 1997
59. Ticehurst (1)
60. Uckfield (1)
61. Vallance (1); electoral division abolished in 1997
62. Wadhurst (1)
63. West St Leonards & Maze Hill (1)
64. Westbourne (1); electoral division abolished in 1997
65. Westdene (1); electoral division abolished in 1997
66. Willingdon (1)
67. Winchelsea (1)
68. Wish (1); electoral division abolished in 1997
69. Woodingdean (1); electoral division abolished in 1997
70. Woodlands (1)

Electoral divisions from 5 May 2005 to 4 May 2017:

1. Alfriston, East Hoathly & Hellingly (1) †
2. Ashdown & Conquest (1)
3. Baird & Ore (1)
4. Battle & Crowhurst (1)
5. Bexhill East (1)
6. Bexhill King Offa (2)
7. Bexhill West (1)
8. Braybrooke & Castle (1)
9. Brede Valley & Marsham (1)
10. Buxted Maresfield (1) †
11. Central St Leonards & Gensing (1)
12. Chailey (1)
13. Crowborough (2)
14. Devonshire (1)
15. Forest Row (1)
16. Framfield & Horam (1)
17. Hailsham & Herstmonceux (2) †
18. Hampden Park (1)
19. Heathfield (1)
20. Hollington & Wishing Tree (1)
21. Langney (1)
22. Lewes (1)
23. Maze Hill & West St Leonards (1)
24. Meads (1)
25. Newhaven & Ouse Valley West (1)
26. Northern Rother (1)
27. Old Hastings & Tressell (1)
28. Old Town (1)
29. Ouse Valley East (1)
30. Peacehaven & Telscombe Towns (2)
31. Pevensey & Westham (1) †
32. Polegate, Willingdon & East Dean (2) †
33. Ratton (1)
34. Ringmer & Lewes Bridge (1)
35. Rother North West (1)
36. Rye & Eastern Rother (1)
37. Seaford Blatchington (1)
38. Seaford Sutton (1)
39. Sovereign (1)
40. St Anthony's (1)
41. St Helens & Silverhill (1)
42. Uckfield (1) †
43. Upperton (1)
44. Wadhurst (1)

† minor boundary changes in 2009

Electoral divisions from 4 May 2017 to present:

1. Arlington, East Hoathly & Hellingly (1)
2. Ashdown & Conquest (1)
3. Baird & Ore (1)
4. Battle & Crowhurst (1)
5. Bexhill East (1)
6. Bexhill North (1)
7. Bexhill South (1)
8. Bexhill West (1)
9. Braybrooke & Castle (1)
10. Brede Valley & Marsham (1)
11. Central St Leonards & Gensing (1)
12. Chailey (1)
13. Crowborough North & Jarvis Brook (1)
14. Crowborough South & St Johns (1)
15. Devonshire (1)
16. Forest Row & Groombridge (1)
17. Hailsham Market (1)
18. Hailsham New Town (1)
19. Hampden Park (1)
20. Heathfield & Mayfield (1)
21. Hollington & Wishing Tree (1)
22. Langney (1)
23. Lewes (1)
24. Maresfield & Buxted (1)
25. Maze Hill & West St Leonards (1)
26. Meads (1)
27. Newhaven & Bishopstone (1)
28. Northern Rother (1)
29. Old Hastings & Tressell (1)
30. Old Town (1)
31. Ouse Valley West & Downs (1)
32. Peacehaven (1)
33. Pevensey & Stone Cross (1)
34. Polegate & Watermill (1)
35. Ratton (1)
36. Ringmer & Lewes Bridge (1)
37. Rother North West (1)
38. Rye & Eastern Rother (1)
39. Seaford North (1)
40. Seaford South (1)
41. Sovereign (1)
42. St Helens & Silverhill (1)
43. St. Anthony's (1)
44. Telscombe (1)
45. Uckfield North (1)
46. Uckfield South with Framfield (1)
47. Upperton (1)
48. Wealden East (1)
49. Wealden North East (1)
50. Willingdon & South Downs (1)

== Unitary authority council ==
=== Brighton and Hove ===
Wards from 1 April 1997 (first election 2 May 1996) to 1 May 2003:

1. (3)
2. (3)
3. (3)
4. (3)
5. (3)
6. (3)
7. (3)
8. (3)
9. (3)
10. (3)
11. (3)
12. (3)
13. (3)
14. (3)
15. (3)
16. (3)
17. (3)
18. (3)
19. (3)
20. (3)
21. (3)
22. (3)
23. (3)
24. (3)
25. (3)
26. (3)

Wards from 1 May 2003 to 4 May 2023:

1. Brunswick & Adelaide (2)
2. Central Hove (2)
3. East Brighton (3)
4. Goldsmid (3)
5. Hangleton & Knoll (3)
6. Hanover & Elm Grove (3)
7. Hollingbury & Stanmer (3); renamed Hollingdean & Stanmer in 2008
8. Moulsecoomb & Bevendean (3)
9. North Portslade (2)
10. Patcham (3)
11. Preston Park (3)
12. Queen’s Park (3)
13. Regency (2)
14. Rottingdean Coastal (3)
15. St Peter’s & North Laine (3)
16. South Portslade (2)
17. Stanford (2); renamed Hove Park in 2010
18. Westbourne (2)
19. Wish (2)
20. Withdean (3)
21. Woodingdean (2)

Wards from 4 May 2023 to present:

1. Brunswick & Adelaide (2)
2. Central Hove (2)
3. Coldean & Stanmer (2)
4. Goldsmid (3)
5. Hangleton & Knoll (3)
6. Hanover & Elm Grove (3)
7. Hollingdean & Fiveways (3)
8. Kemptown (2)
9. Moulsecoomb & Bevendean (3)
10. North Portslade (2)
11. Patcham & Hollingbury (3)
12. Preston Park (3)
13. Queen’s Park (2)
14. Regency (2)
15. Rottingdean & West Saltdean (2)
16. Round Hill (2)
17. South Portslade (2)
18. West Hill & North Laine (2)
19. Westbourne & Poets’ Corner (2)
20. Westdene & Hove Park (3)
21. Whitehawk & Marina (2)
22. Wish (2)
23. Woodingdean (2)

== District councils ==
=== Eastbourne ===
Wards from 1 April 1974 (first election 7 June 1973) to 6 May 1976:

Wards from 6 May 1976 to 2 May 2002:

Wards from 2 May 2002 to present (boundary changes in 2019):

1. Devonshire (3)
2. Hampden Park (3)
3. Langney (3)
4. Meads (3)
5. Old Town (3)
6. Ratton (3)
7. St Anthony's (3)
8. Sovereign (3)
9. Upperton (3)

=== Hastings ===
Wards from 1 April 1974 (first election 7 June 1973) to 3 May 1979:

Wards from 3 May 1979 to 2 May 2002:

Wards from 2 May 2002 to present (boundary changes in 2018):

1. Ashdown (2)
2. Baird (2)
3. Braybrooke (2)
4. Castle (2)
5. Central St Leonards (2)
6. Conquest (2)
7. Gensing (2)
8. Hollington (2)
9. Maze Hill (2)
10. Old Hastings (2)
11. Ore (2)
12. St Helens (2)
13. Silverhill (2)
14. Tressell (2)
15. West St Leonards (2)
16. Wishing Tree (2)

=== Lewes ===
Wards from 1 April 1974 (first election 7 June 1973) to 5 May 1983:

Wards from 5 May 1983 to 1 May 2003:

Wards from 1 May 2003 to 2 May 2019:

1. Barcombe & Hamsey (1)
2. Chailey & Wivelsfield (2)
3. Ditchling & Westmeston (1)
4. East Saltdean & Telscombe Cliffs (3)
5. Kingston (1)
6. Lewes Bridge (2)
7. Lewes Castle (2)
8. Lewes Priory (3)
9. Newhaven Denton & Meeching (3)
10. Newhaven Valley (2)
11. Newick (1)
12. Ouse Valley & Ringmer (3)
13. Peacehaven East (2)
14. Peacehaven North (2)
15. Peacehaven West (2)
16. Plumpton, Streat, East Chiltington & St John (Without) (1)
17. Seaford Central (2)
18. Seaford East (2)
19. Seaford North (2)
20. Seaford South (2)
21. Seaford West (2)

Wards from 2 May 2019 to present:

1. Chailey, Barcombe & Hamsey (2)
2. Ditchling & Westmeston (1)
3. East Saltdean & Telscombe Cliffs (3)
4. Kingston (1)
5. Lewes Bridge (2)
6. Lewes Castle (2)
7. Lewes Priory (3)
8. Newhaven North (2)
9. Newhaven South (3)
10. Newick (1)
11. Ouse Valley & Ringmer (3)
12. Peacehaven East (2)
13. Peacehaven North (2)
14. Peacehaven West (2)
15. Plumpton, Streat, East Chiltington & St John (1)
16. Seaford Central (2)
17. Seaford East (2)
18. Seaford North (2)
19. Seaford South (2)
20. Seaford West (2)
21. Wivelsfield (1)

=== Rother ===
Wards from 1 April 1974 (first election 7 June 1973) to 5 May 1983:

Wards from 5 May 1983 to 1 May 2003:

Wards from 1 May 2003 to 2 May 2019:

1. Battle Town (2)
2. Brede Valley (2)
3. Central (2)
4. Collington (2)
5. Crowhurst (1)
6. Darwell (2)
7. Eastern Rother (2)
8. Ewhurst & Sedlescombe (1)
9. Kewhurst (2)
10. Marsham (2)
11. Old Town (2)
12. Rother Levels (2)
13. Rye (2)
14. Sackville (2)
15. St Marks (2)
16. St Michaels (2)
17. St Stephens (2)
18. Salehurst (2)
19. Sidley (2)
20. Ticehurst & Etchingham (2)

Wards from 2 May 2019 to present:

1. Bexhill Central (2)
2. Bexhill Collington (2)
3. Bexhill Kewhurst (2)
4. Bexhill Old Town & Worsham (2)
5. Bexhill Pebsham & St Michaels (2)
6. Bexhill Sackville (2)
7. Bexhill Sidley (2)
8. Bexhill St Marks (2)
9. Bexhill St Stephens (2)
10. Brede & Udimore (1)
11. Burwash & the Weald (2)
12. Catsfield & Crowhurst (1)
13. Eastern Rother (2)
14. Hurst Green & Ticehurst (2)
15. North Battle, Netherfield & Whatlington (2)
16. Northern Rother (2)
17. Robertsbridge (1)
18. Rye & Winchelsea (2)
19. Sedlescombe & Westfield (2)
20. South Battle & Telham (1)
21. Southern Rother (2)

=== Wealden ===
Wards from 1 April 1974 (first election 7 June 1973) to 5 May 1983:

Wards from 5 May 1983 to 1 May 2003:

Wards from 1 May 2003 to 2 May 2019:

1. Alfriston (1) †
2. Buxted & Maresfield (2) †
3. Chiddingly & East Hoathly (1)
4. Cross in Hand/Five Ashes (1)
5. Crowborough East (2)
6. Crowborough Jarvis Brook (1)
7. Crowborough North (2)
8. Crowborough St Johns (1)
9. Crowborough West (2)
10. Danehill/Fletching/Nutley (2)
11. East Dean (1) †
12. Forest Row (2)
13. Framfield (1)
14. Frant/Withyham (2) †
15. Hailsham Central & North (2)
16. Hailsham East (1)
17. Hailsham South & West (3) †
18. Hartfield (1)
19. Heathfield East (1)
20. Heathfield North & Central (3)
21. Hellingly (2) †
22. Herstmonceux (1)
23. Horam (1)
24. Mayfield (1)
25. Ninfield & Hooe with Wartling (1)
26. Pevensey & Westham (3) †
27. Polegate North (2) †
28. Polegate South (1) †
29. Rotherfield (1)
30. Uckfield Central (1)
31. Uckfield New Town (1)
32. Uckfield North (2) †
33. Uckfield Ridgewood (1)
34. Wadhurst (2) †
35. Willingdon (3) †

† minor boundary changes in 2007

Wards from 2 May 2019 to present:

1. Arlington (1)
2. Buxted (1)
3. Chiddingly, East Hoathly & Waldron (1)
4. Crowborough Central (1)
5. Crowborough Jarvis Brook (1)
6. Crowborough North (1)
7. Crowborough South East (1)
8. Crowborough South West (1)
9. Crowborough St Johns (1)
10. Danehill & Fletching (1)
11. Forest Row (1)
12. Framfield & Cross-in-Hand (1)
13. Frant & Wadhurst (2)
14. Hadlow Down & Rotherfield (1)
15. Hailsham Central (1)
16. Hailsham East (1)
17. Hailsham North (1)
18. Hailsham North West (1)
19. Hailsham South (1)
20. Hailsham West (1)
21. Hartfield (1)
22. Heathfield North (1)
23. Heathfield South (1)
24. Hellingly (1)
25. Herstmonceux & Pevensey Levels (2)
26. Horam & Punnetts Town (2)
27. Lower Willingdon (1)
28. Maresfield (1)
29. Mayfield & Five Ashes (1)
30. Pevensey Bay (1)
31. Polegate Central (1)
32. Polegate North (1)
33. Polegate South & Willingdon Watermill (1)
34. South Downs (1)
35. Stone Cross (1)
36. Uckfield East (1)
37. Uckfield New Town (2)
38. Uckfield North (1)
39. Uckfield Ridgewood & Little Horsted (1)
40. Upper Willingdon (1)
41. Withyham (1)

== Former district councils ==
=== Brighton ===
Wards from 1 April 1974 (first election 7 June 1973) to 5 May 1983:

Wards from 5 May 1983 to 1 April 1997 (district abolished):

=== Hove ===
Wards from 1 April 1974 (first election 7 June 1973) to 3 May 1979:

Wards from 3 May 1979 to 1 April 1997 (district abolished):

== Electoral wards by constituency ==
Wards as they existed on 1 December 2020.

=== Bexhill and Battle ===
Rother: Bexhill Central; Bexhill Collington; Bexhill Kewhurst; Bexhill Old Town & Worsham; Bexhill Pebsham & St. Michaels; Bexhill Sackville; Bexhill St. Marks; Bexhill St. Stephens; Bexhill Sidley; Brede & Udimore; Burwash & the Weald; Catsfield & Crowhurst; Hurst Green & Ticehurst; North Battle, Netherfield & Whatlington; Northern Rother; Robertsbridge; Sedlescombe & Westfield; South Battle & Telham.

Wealden: Herstmonceux & Pevensey Levels; Pevensey Bay.

=== Brighton Kemptown and Peacehaven ===
Brighton and Hove: East Brighton; Hanover & Elm Grove (polling district PHEA & PHEF (to the east of Queen's Park Road)); Moulsecoomb & Bevendean; Queen's Park; Rottingdean Coastal; Woodingdean.

Lewes: East Saltdean & Telscombe Cliffs; Peacehaven East; Peacehaven North; Peacehaven West.

=== Brighton Pavilion ===
Brighton and Hove: Hanover & Elm Grove (polling districts PHEB; PHEC; PHED and PHEE; & PHEF (to the west of Queen’s Park Road)); Hollingdean & Stanmer; Patcham; Preston Park; Regency; St Peter's & North Laine; Withdean.

=== East Grinstead and Uckfield (part) ===
Lewes: Chailey, Barcombe & Hamsey; Newick; Wivelsfield.

Wealden: Buxted; Danehill & Fletching; Forest Row; Maresfield; Uckfield East; Uckfield New Town; Uckfield North; Uckfield Ridgewood & Little Horsted.

=== Eastbourne ===
Eastbourne: Devonshire; Hampden Park; Langney; Meads; Old Town; Ratton; St Anthony's; Sovereign; Upperton; Willingdon.

=== Hastings and Rye ===
Hastings: Ashdown; Baird; Braybrooke; Castle; Central St Leonards; Conquest; Gensing; Hollington; Maze Hill; Old Hastings; Ore; St Helens; Silverhill; Tressell; West St Leonards; Wishing Tree.

Rother: Eastern Rother; Rye & Winchelsea; Southern Rother.

=== Hove and Portslade ===
Brighton and Hove: Brunswick & Adelaide; Central Hove; Goldsmid; Hangleton & Knoll; Hove Park; North Portslade; South Portslade; Westbourne; Wish.

=== Lewes ===
Lewes: Ditchling & Westmeston; Kingston; Lewes Bridge; Lewes Castle; Lewes Priory; Newhaven North; Newhaven South; Ouse Valley & Ringmer; Plumpton, Streat, East Chiltington & St. John; Seaford Central; Seaford East; Seaford North; Seaford South; Seaford West.

Wealden: Arlington; Lower Willingdon; Polegate Central; Polegate North; Polegate South & Willingdon Watermill; South Downs; Stone Cross; Upper Willingdon.

=== Sussex Weald ===
Wealden: Chiddingly, East Hoathly & Waldron; Crowborough Central; Crowborough Jarvis Brook; Crowborough North; Crowborough St. Johns; Crowborough South East; Crowborough South West; Framfield & Cross-in-Hand; Frant & Wadhurst; Hadlow Down & Rotherfield; Hailsham Central; Hailsham East; Hailsham North; Hailsham North West; Hailsham South; Hailsham West; Hartfield; Heathfield North; Heathfield South; Hellingly; Horam & Punnetts Town; Mayfield & Five Ashes; Withyham.

== See also ==
- List of parliamentary constituencies in East Sussex
