= 1996 Brighton and Hove Borough Council election =

1996 UK local government election

← 1995 (Brighton); 1995 (Hove)	9 May 1996	1999 →

All 78 seats to Brighton and Hove Borough Council 40 seats needed for a majority
- Turnout: 38.4%
	Majority party	Minority party
Party	Labour	Conservative
Seats won	54	22
Seat change	▲10	▼9
Popular vote	105,903	73,684
Percentage	51.0%	35.5%
	Third party	Fourth party
Party	Green	Ind. Conservative
Seats won	1	1
Seat change	▲1	▲1
Popular vote	8,585	2,906
Percentage	4.1%	1.4%
- Winner of each seat at the 1996 Brighton and Hove Borough Council election
Council control after election
Labour

The 1996 Brighton and Hove Borough Council election was held on 9 May 1996 to elect members to the new unitary authority of Brighton and Hove Borough Council in East Sussex, England. It was the inaugural election to the new council, and was held nearly a year before the council formally came into being on 1 April 1997, replacing the former Brighton Borough Council and Hove Borough Council. The councillors elected in May 1996 served as a shadow authority alongside the outgoing councils, overseeing the transition to the new arrangements, until coming into their powers in April 1997.

The whole council was up for election, and all 78 councillors were elected from 26 wards. The ward boundaries were the same as the old boundaries used in previous elections for the two predecessor authorities.

The result was a clear Labour victory, with the party winning an overall majority of seats. Labour had previously controlled both predecessor authorities: Brighton Borough Council since 1986, and Hove Borough Council since 1995.

== Summary ==
=== Comparison with the previous councils ===
The wards and number of seats in each wards remained the same as the respective borough councils and therefore the swing and incumbents are all technically nominal.

Comparison with Brighton Borough and Hove Borough Councils
Party	Brighton and Hove Borough Council 1996		Pre merger councils									
Party	Brighton and Hove Borough Council 1996		Brighton Borough (thirds)						Hove Borough (all out)		Total (nominal)	
Party	Brighton and Hove Borough Council 1996		1992		1994		1995		1995		Total (nominal)	
Party	Seats	%	Seats	%	Seats	%	Seats	%	Seats	%	Seats	%
Labour	54	46.7	3	32.6	12	49.6	13	55.7	11	44.1	39	45.5
Conservative	22	32.6	13	55.1	4	32.6	3	29.7	16	33.8	36	37.8
Green Party	1	8.6	0	4.8	0	4.3	0	4.8	0	5.8	0	4.9
Liberal Democrat	0	9.1	0	7.6	0	13.1	0	9.2	3	16	3	11.5
Independent	1	1.3	0	0	0	0	0	0.1	0	0.2	0	0.1

=== Election result ===
1996 Brighton and Hove Borough Council election
Party	Candidates	Seats	Gains	Losses	Net gain/loss	Seats %	Votes %	Votes	+/−
Labour	78	54	12	2	▲10	69.2	51.0	105,903	N/A
Conservative	77	22	1	10	▼9	28.2	35.5	73,684	N/A
Green	28	1	1	0	▲1	1.3	4.1	8,585	N/A
Ind. Conservative	9	1	1	0	▲1	1.3	1.4	2,906	N/A
Liberal Democrats	59	0	0	3	▼3	0.0	7.8	16,260	N/A
Residents	1	0	0	0	Steady	0.0	0.1	227	N/A
Militant Labour	1	0	0	0	Steady	0.0	0.1	162	N/A

=== Council composition ===
After the inaugural elections the composition of the council was compared to its previous consistent councils.

Brighton Borough Council composition after the election in 1995 was:

↓
28	20
Lab	Con

Hove Borough Council composition after the election in 1995 was:

↓
16	11	3
Lab	Con	LD

After the inaugural election in 1996 the composition of the council was:

↓
54	22	1	1
Lab	Con	G	I

== Ward results ==
Candidates who were previously councillors in the Brighton Borough Council or Hove Borough Council are indicated with a (*)

=== Brunswick and Adelaide ===
Brunswick and Adelaide (3)
Party	Candidate	Votes	%
Labour	Davies C.	941	40.4
Labour	Hunt F. Ms.	919	39.5
Labour	McGinley J.	841	36.1
Liberal Democrats	Hillman J.*	749	32.2
Liberal Democrats	Wakeling J. Ms.*	691	29.7
Liberal Democrats	Vivian P. Ms.	671	28.8
Conservative	Hunter S. Ms.	610	26.2
Conservative	Boustead C.	604	25.9
Conservative	Mitchell J.	583	25.0
Green	Nightengale K.	230	9.9
Turnout		2,329	30.7
Registered electors		7,587	
Labour gain from Liberal Democrats			
Labour gain from Liberal Democrats			
Labour gain from Liberal Democrats			

=== Goldsmid ===
Goldsmid (3)
Party	Candidate	Votes	%
Conservative	Langston J. Ms.*	1,330	49.5
Conservative	Langston S.*	1,294	48.2
Conservative	Jordan B.*	1,292	48.1
Labour	Bower S. Lab	1,145	42.6
Labour	Visor V. Ms.	1,118	41.6
Labour	Ralfe B.	1,064	39.6
Liberal Democrats	Thomas P. Ms.	246	9.2
Liberal Democrats	Driffill B.	237	8.8
Green	Hudson G.	225	8.4
Liberal Democrats	Taylor S.	224	8.3
Turnout		2,686	36.7
Registered electors		7,318	
Conservative hold			
Conservative hold			
Conservative hold			

=== Hangleton ===
Hangleton (3)
Party	Candidate	Votes	%
Labour	Keilty G.*	1,421	51.9
Labour	Newland D.	1,309	47.8
Labour	Walshe B. Ms.*	1,300	47.5
Conservative	Willows P.	1,090	39.8
Conservative	Jackson M.	1,066	39.0
Conservative	Jackson G.	1,055	38.6
Liberal Democrats	Walls M. Ms	185	6.8
Liberal Democrats	Bates E.	167	6.1
Liberal Democrats	Bickle P. Ms	164	6.0
Green	McHenry J. Ms.	99	3.6
Turnout		2,736	43.1
Registered electors		6,348	
Labour hold			
Labour hold			
Labour hold			

=== Hanover ===
Hanover (3)
Party	Candidate	Votes	%
Labour	Smith J. Ms.*	2,100	71.5
Labour	Schaffer S. Ms.*	1,990	67.8
Labour	Morley C.	1,789	60.9
Green	Chapman K. Ms.	665	22.6
Conservative	Dudeney R. Ms.	380	12.9
Conservative	Jackson G.	338	11.5
Conservative	Radford-Kirby E. Ms.	323	11.0
Liberal Democrats	Cornelius C.	296	10.1
Turnout		2,936	34.7
Registered electors		8,461	
Labour hold			
Labour hold			
Labour hold			

=== Hollingbury ===
Hollingbury (3)
Party	Candidate	Votes	%
Labour	David Lepper*	1,891	77.9
Labour	Lepper J. Ms.	1,798	74.1
Labour	Finch B.*	1,742	71.8
Conservative	Franklin C. Ms.	384	15.8
Conservative	McGrath M.	377	15.5
Conservative	Norman K.	359	14.8
Green	Gardner P.	276	11.4
Liberal Democrats	Lamb D.	266	11.0
Liberal Democrats	Powell D.	194	8.0
Turnout		2,426	32.1
Registered electors		7,556	
Labour hold			
Labour hold			
Labour hold			

=== Kings Cliff ===
Kings Cliff (3)
Party	Candidate	Votes	%
Labour	Duncan I.*	1,577	66.5
Labour	Burgess S.*	1,567	66.1
Labour	Mitchell G. Ms.*	1,529	64.5
Conservative	Radford D. Ms.	634	26.8
Conservative	Sampson S.	593	25.0
Conservative	Amin J.	589	24.9
Green	Hodd J. Ms.	235	9.9
Liberal Democrats	Jones M.	217	9.2
Turnout		2,370	35.4
Registered electors		6,696	
Labour hold			
Labour hold			
Labour hold			

=== Marine ===
Marine (3)
Party	Candidate	Votes	%
Labour	Marsh M. Ms.*	1,347	59.1
Labour	Desmond Turner	1,309	57.4
Labour	Johnston M.	1,275	55.9
Conservative	Mears M. Ms.*	1,003	44.0
Conservative	Smith D.	916	40.2
Conservative	Fairs B. Ms.	906	39.8
Militant Labour	Dale K.	162	7.1
Liberal Democrats	Clements I.	140	6.1
Green	Coyne B. Ms.	133	5.8
Liberal Democrats	Howard P. Ms.	126	5.5
Liberal Democrats	Howard A.	114	5.0
Turnout		2,279	29.2
Registered electors		7,803	
Labour hold			
Labour hold			
Labour gain from Conservative			

=== Moulsecoomb ===
Moulsecoomb (3)
Party	Candidate	Votes	%
Labour	Meadows A. Ms.*	1,097	62.9
Labour	Hazelgrove J.	1,079	61.9
Labour	Tonks F.*	1,019	58.4
Conservative	Gunn K. Ms.*	407	23.3
Conservative	Amiet J. Ms.	399	22.9
Conservative	Stevens J.	375	21.5
Residents	Avey C.	227	13.0
Liberal Democrats	Lovatt J.	179	10.3
Green	Mills A. Ms.	127	7.3
Turnout		1,744	27.1
Registered electors		6,435	
Labour hold			
Labour gain from Conservative			
Labour hold			

=== Nevill ===
Nevill (3)
Party	Candidate	Votes	%
Conservative	Lewis P.	1,406	50.3
Conservative	Worgan M.	1,398	50.1
Conservative	Wade S.	1,325	48.4
Labour	James H. Ms.	1,250	44.8
Labour	Anthony D.	1,242	44.5
Labour	Spillman H.	1,133	40.6
Liberal Democrats	Alldred E.	187	6.7
Green	Phillips J. Ms.	123	4.4
Turnout		2,793	45.3
Registered electors		6,165	
Conservative hold			
Conservative gain from Labour			
Conservative hold			

=== North Portslade ===
North Portslade (3)
Party	Candidate	Votes	%
Labour	Carden B.*	1,720	70.3
Labour	Steer H.	1,686	68.9
Labour	Turner D.	1,638	66.9
Conservative	Saunders D. Ms.	634	25.9
Conservative	Braybrook B.	608	24.8
Conservative	Hess M.	533	21.8
Green	Gray K.	157	6.4
Turnout		2,448	35.1
Registered electors		6,975	
Labour hold			
Labour hold			
Labour hold			

=== Patcham ===
Patcham (3)
Party	Candidate	Votes	%
Conservative	Theobald C. Ms.*	2,156	59.3
Conservative	Theobald G.*	2,153	59.2
Conservative	Sheldon J.	2,076	57.1
Labour	Blackwood R.	1,115	30.6
Labour	Blackwood M. Ms.	1,114	30.6
Labour	Miller H.	1,005	27.6
Liberal Democrats	De Souza J. Ms.	469	12.9
Liberal Democrats	Latimer D.	359	9.9
Liberal Democrats	Latimer D. Ms.	356	9.8
Green	Haase A.	99	2.7
Turnout		3,638	52.5
Registered electors		6,929	
Conservative hold			
Conservative hold			
Conservative hold			

=== Portslade South ===
Portslade South (3)
Party	Candidate	Votes	%
Labour	Ivor Caplin*	1,611	61.2
Labour	Collier S.*	1,552	59.0
Labour	John S. Ms.*	1,434	55.0
Conservative	Kemble E.	709	26.9
Conservative	Greenwood C. Ms.	704	28.8
Conservative	Veale M.	681	25.9
Liberal Democrats	Donovan N.	300	11.4
Liberal Democrats	James I.	295	11.2
Green	Mylton-Thorley M. Ms.	95	3.6
Turnout		2,631	38.4
Registered electors		6,851	
Labour hold			
Labour hold			
Labour hold			

=== Preston ===
Preston (3)
Party	Candidate	Votes	%
Labour	McCaffery J. Ms.	1,803	52.2
Labour	Austin L. Ms.	1,792	51.9
Labour	Spray J. Ms.*	1,756	50.9
Conservative	Mallender G. Con	1,264	36.6
Conservative	Marchant V.*	1,262	36.5
Conservative	Nilchiber K.	1,262	36.5
Liberal Democrats	Hunter T.	334	9.7
Liberal Democrats	Potts S.	294	8.5
Liberal Democrats	Schelwald E.	255	7.4
Green	Littman L.	254	7.4
Turnout		3,453	44.9
Registered electors		7,690	
Labour hold			
Labour gain from Conservative			
Labour hold			

=== Queens Park ===
Queens Park (3)
Party	Candidate	Votes	%
Labour	Lythell J.*	1,623	67.6
Labour	Bodfish K.	1,566	65.3
Labour	Townsend J.*	1,540	64.2
Conservative	Allaway H.	621	25.9
Conservative	Vivian S. Ms.	601	25.0
Conservative	Wells S. Ms.	562	23.4
Green	Chadwick S. Ms	275	11.5
Liberal Democrats	Blease J. Ms.	195	8.1
Liberal Democrats	Blease J.	192	8.0
Turnout		2,400	38.0
Registered electors		6,316	
Labour hold			
Labour gain from Conservative			
Labour hold			

=== Regency ===
Regency (3)
Party	Candidate	Votes	%
Labour	Ping N.*	1,553	59.2
Labour	Pennington R.*	1,430	54.5
Labour	Warmington J.	1,404	53.5
Conservative	Cameron J.	776	29.6
Conservative	Boggon M.*	758	28.9
Conservative	Cockman D.	741	28.3
Green	Hyde Parker A.	347	13.2
Liberal Democrats	Freeman T.	257	9.8
Liberal Democrats	Guild J.	241	9.2
Liberal Democrats	Cotton E.	203	7.7
Turnout		2,623	36.3
Registered electors		7,227	
Labour hold			
Labour hold			
Labour gain from Conservative			

=== Rottingdean ===
Rottingdean (3)
Party	Candidate	Votes	%
Conservative	Wrigley S. Ms.*	1,745	54.8
Conservative	Hunt B.	1,738	54.6
Conservative	Simon Radford-Kirby	1,697	53.3
Labour	Bunting M.	783	24.6
Labour	Moriarty J.	732	23.0
Labour	Gray A. Ms.	715	22.5
Liberal Democrats	Davidson D. Ms.	470	14.8
Liberal Democrats	De Souza H.	470	14.8
Liberal Democrats	Edwards P.	437	13.7
Ind. Conservative	Grant M.	201	6.3
Ind. Conservative	Wright N.*	193	6.1
Ind. Conservative	Wright A. Ms.	181	5.7
Green	Berrington J.	113	3.6
Turnout		3,183	41.7
Registered electors		7,633	
Conservative hold			
Conservative hold			
Conservative hold			

=== Seven Dials ===
Seven Dials (3)
Party	Candidate	Votes	%
Labour	Austin R.	1,784	76.0
Labour	Middleton M.*	1,684	71.8
Labour	Robinson N.*	1,680	71.6
Conservative	Bowes P.	437	18.6
Conservative	Gowans J.	437	18.6
Conservative	Larkin R. Ms.	414	17.6
Green	Needham I.	358	15.3
Liberal Democrats	Heale R.	269	11.5
Liberal Democrats	Oldfield E. Ms.	233	9.9
Liberal Democrats	Huggins B.	231	9.8
Turnout		2,346	31.8
Registered electors		7,377	
Labour hold			
Labour hold			
Labour hold			

=== St. Peters ===
St. Peters (3)
Party	Candidate	Votes	%
Green	Pete West	1,576	41.9
Labour	Charleton S.	1,517	40.4
Labour	Gwyn-Jones L. Ms.*	1,451	38.6
Labour	Simpson C. Ms.*	1,408	37.5
Green	Whale R. Ms.	973	25.9
Green	Young F. Ms.	845	22.5
Conservative	Brimmell C.	311	8.3
Conservative	Maclean E. Ms.	259	6.9
Conservative	Maclean I.	237	6.3
Liberal Democrats	Fairweather M.	199	5.3
Liberal Democrats	Harden W.	162	4.3
Liberal Democrats	Parker W.	135	3.6
Turnout		3,757	50.1
Registered electors		7,499	
Green gain from Labour			
Labour hold			
Labour hold			

=== Stanford ===
Stanford (3)
Party	Candidate	Votes	%
Conservative	Adams M. Ms.*	1,572	66.9
Conservative	Kapp J.*	1,525	64.9
Conservative	Rowe B.*	1,525	64.9
Labour	Jones A.	478	20.3
Labour	Montague S.	461	19.6
Labour	Lord S.	459	19.5
Liberal Democrats	Latham B.	342	14.5
Liberal Democrats	Innes D. Ms.	331	14.1
Liberal Democrats	Walls P.	274	11.7
Green	Jester M.	92	3.9
Turnout		2,351	36.5
Registered electors		6,441	
Conservative hold			
Conservative hold			
Conservative hold			

=== Stanmer ===
Stanmer (3)
Party	Candidate	Votes	%
Labour	Framroze T.*	1,597	50.8
Labour	Hawkes P. Ms.*	1,589	50.6
Labour	Beishon G. Ms.	1,551	49.4
Conservative	Careless D.	922	29.4
Conservative	Fairhall D.	886	28.2
Conservative	Pacifico M.	854	27.2
Liberal Democrats	Bailey P.	258	8.2
Green	Tofts P.	231	7.4
Liberal Democrats	Imms D. Ms.	207	6.6
Liberal Democrats	Garrett P.	207	6.6
Turnout		3,141	40.2
Registered electors		7,814	
Labour hold			
Labour hold			
Labour gain from Conservative			

=== Tenantry ===
Tenantry (3)
Party	Candidate	Votes	%
Labour	Steve Bassam*	1,709	68.4
Labour	Ballance J.	1,581	63.2
Labour	Durr A.*	1,579	63.2
Conservative	Dudeney D.	623	24.9
Conservative	Toner M.*	580	23.2
Conservative	Plater L.	549	22.0
Green	Santamaria L.	260	10.4
Liberal Democrats	Weller P.	241	9.5
Turnout		2,500	33.6
Registered electors		7,539	
Labour hold			
Labour gain from Conservative			
Labour hold			

=== Vallance ===
Vallance (3)
Party	Candidate	Votes	%
Labour	Battle S.	1,235	48.6
Labour	Warman-Brown F. Ms.*	1,217	47.9
Labour	Gibbling M.*	1,198	47.1
Conservative	Martin P.	973	38.3
Conservative	Peltzer Dunn G.	968	38.1
Conservative	Bennett J. Ms.	941	37.0
Liberal Democrats	Bates K. Ms.	234	9.2
Liberal Democrats	Denyer P.	210	8.3
Ind. Conservative	Hogan V.	208	8.2
Green	Da Costa J. Ms.	168	6.6
Liberal Democrats	Elgood P.	167	6.6
Turnout		2,542	35.6
Registered electors		7,141	
Labour hold			
Labour hold			
Labour hold			

=== Westbourne ===
Westbourne (3)
Party	Candidate	Votes	%
Conservative	Buttimer A. Ms.*	1,221	47.2
Conservative	Brown V. Ms.*	1,186	45.8
Ind. Conservative	Oxley B.*	1,041	40.2
Labour	Cooper R.	1,008	39.0
Labour	Benians G.	994	38.4
Labour	Gill P.	965	37.3
Liberal Democrats	Bull R. Ms.	305	11.8
Liberal Democrats	Lake J. Ms.	289	11.2
Liberal Democrats	Hayes D.	279	10.8
Ind. Conservative	Furness N.	236	9.1
Green	Mueller M.	113	4.4
Turnout		2,587	35.3
Registered electors		7,330	
Conservative hold			
Conservative hold			
Ind. Conservative gain from Conservative			

=== Westdene ===
Westdene (3)
Party	Candidate	Votes	%
Conservative	Drake H.*	1,656	47.0
Conservative	Drake P. Ms.	1,624	46.1
Conservative	Norman A. Ms.	1,514	43.0
Labour	Prentice S. Ms.	1,402	39.8
Labour	Allen K.	1,402	39.8
Labour	Matz P.	1,282	36.4
Ind. Conservative	Humphrey J.*	327	9.3
Ind. Conservative	Barrett M.*	299	8.5
Liberal Democrats	McBeth D.	243	6.9
Liberal Democrats	Rimmington J. Ms.	222	6.3
Ind. Conservative	Rogers L. Ms.	220	6.2
Liberal Democrats	Brown P.	218	6.2
Green	Keenan G. Ms.	186	5.3
Turnout		3,524	47.8
Registered electors		7,373	
Conservative hold			
Conservative hold			
Conservative hold			

=== Wish ===
Wish (3)
Party	Candidate	Votes	%
Labour	Bowden C.*	1,398	51.2
Labour	Murphy P.*	1,289	47.2
Labour	Pratt A.*	1,276	46.7
Conservative	Cruikshank-Robb E.	1,211	44.3
Conservative	Brand S. Ms.	1,170	42.8
Conservative	Brand L.	1,160	42.5
Liberal Democrats	Percy A.	253	9.3
Liberal Democrats	Storey J.	246	9.0
Green	Baker N.	189	6.9
Turnout		2,731	40.8
Registered electors		6,695	
Labour hold			
Labour hold			
Labour hold			

=== Woodingdean ===
Woodingdean (3)
Party	Candidate	Votes	%
Labour	Moorhouse M. Ms.*	1,635	49.0
Conservative	Wells G.	1,608	48.2
Conservative	Stiles P. Ms.*	1,515	45.4
Conservative	Dudeney D.	1,489	44.6
Labour	Griffiths G.	1,385	41.5
Labour	Newington J.	1,325	39.7
Liberal Democrats	Pearce L. Ms.	325	9.7
Green	Powell V.	141	4.2
Turnout		3,339	44.9
Registered electors		7,437	
Labour hold			
Conservative hold			
Conservative hold			
