= Hove Borough Council elections =

Local government elections in East Sussex, England

Hove was a non-metropolitan district in East Sussex, England. It was abolished on 1 April 1997 and replaced by Brighton and Hove.

== Political control ==
From the first election to the council in 1973 until its abolition in 1997 political control of the council was held by the following parties:

Party in control	Years
Conservative	1973–1995
Labour	1995–1997

=== Leadership ===
The last leader of the council, Ivor Caplin, who had led the council from 1995, went on to be the first deputy leader of the replacement authority, Brighton and Hove City Council, and was also elected as the Member of Parliament for the Hove constituency the month after the council's abolition.

Councillor	Party	From	To
Ivor Caplin	Labour	12 May 1995	31 Mar 1997

== Council elections ==
- 1973 Hove Borough Council election
- 1976 Hove Borough Council election
- 1979 Hove Borough Council election (New ward boundaries)
- 1983 Hove Borough Council election
- 1987 Hove Borough Council election
- 1991 Hove Borough Council election
- 1995 Hove Borough Council election (Borough boundary changes took place but the number of seats remained the same)
