= 2003 Brighton and Hove City Council election =

2003 UK local government election

← 1999	1 May 2003	2007 →

All 54 council seats 28 seats needed for a majority
	First party	Second party
Leader	Ken Bodfish
Party	Labour	Conservative
Leader since	1999
Last election	34	17
Seats won	24	20
Seat change	▼10	▲3
Popular vote	70,412	76,578
Percentage	31.71%	34.49%
	Third party	Fourth party
Party	Green	Liberal Democrats
Last election	3	5
Seats won	6	3
Seat change	▲3	▼2
Popular vote	36,810	33,586
Percentage	16.58%	15.13%
- Map of results of 2003 election
Leader,
Majority Party before election
Ken Bodfish
Labour
Leader,
Council Control after election
Ken Bodfish
No overall control

Elections to Brighton and Hove City Council on the south coast of England were held on 1 May 2003. The whole council (a unitary authority) was up for election and all 54 councillors were elected from 21 wards. Labour lost their majority on the council but continued to govern in a minority administration.

== Summary ==
=== Election result ===
2003 Brighton and Hove City Council election
Party	Candidates	Seats	Gains	Losses	Net gain/loss	Seats %	Votes %	Votes	+/−
Labour Co-op	54	24	2	2	▼21	44.4	31.6	70,412	–14.2
Conservative	54	20	1	3	▼7	37.0	34.4	76,578	–3.0
Green	53	6	0	0	▲3	11.1	16.5	36,810	+5.5
Liberal Democrats	54	3	1	0	Steady	5.6	15.4	34,374	+10.2
Independent	7	1	1	0	▲1	1.9	1.5	3,286	+1.4
Socialist Alliance (England)	2	0	0	0	Steady	0.0	0.2	476	N/A
Socialist Labour	2	0	0	0	Steady	0.0	0.2	357	+0.1
BNP	1	0	0	0	Steady	0.0	0.1	314	N/A
UKIP	1	0	0	0	Steady	0.0	0.1	197	N/A

- note: Socialist Alliance stood as Socialist Alliance Against The War

== Ward results ==
=== Brunswick and Adelaide ===
Brunswick & Adelaide (2)
Party	Candidate	Votes	%	±%
Liberal Democrats	Paul Elgood	1,222	29.40	
Liberal Democrats	David Watkins	1,103	26.54	
Labour Co-op	Daniel Fox	622	14.97	
Labour Co-op	John Warmington	542	13.04	
Green	Felicity Tanous	291	7.00	
Conservative	Harry Haynes	269	6.47	
Conservative	Debra Wade	266	6.40	
Independent	Nigel Furness	63	1.16	
Independent	Valentine Hogan	47	1.13	
Turnout		2,549	33.0	+4.1
Registered electors		7,725		
Liberal Democrats hold				
Liberal Democrats hold				

=== Central Hove ===
Central Hove (2)
Party	Candidate	Votes	%	±%
Conservative	Averil Older	1,092	19.64	
Conservative	Jan Young	1,062	19.10	
Liberal Democrats	Jenny Barnard-Langston	884	15.90	
Liberal Democrats	Mark Barnard	847	15.23	
Labour Co-op	Christopher Wainwright	544	9.78	
Labour Co-op	Alun Jones	513	9.23	
Green	Michael Butler	327	5.88	
Green	Jacqueline DaCosta	291	5.23	
Turnout			41.58	
Conservative win (new seat)				
Conservative win (new seat)				

=== East Brighton ===
East Brighton (3)
Party	Candidate	Votes	%	±%
Labour Co-op	Gilliam Mitchell	1,545	14.12	
Labour Co-op	Warren Morgan	1,451	13.26	
Labour Co-op	Craig Turton	1,223	11.18	
Conservative	Edward Faulkner	1,062	9.71	
Conservative	Sally Wells	1,017	9.30	
Conservative	Ian Middleton	976	8.92	
Liberal Democrats	Richard Bowden	770	7.04	
Liberal Democrats	John Barrow	682	6.23	
Green	Diana Hicks	623	5.69	
Liberal Democrats	Thomas William Stokes	553	5.05	
Green	Julia Knowles	475	4.34	
Green	Stephen M^{c}Laren Watson	396	3.62	
Socialist Labour	John McLeod	167	1.53	
Turnout			38.6	
Labour Co-op win (new seat)				
Labour Co-op win (new seat)				
Labour Co-op win (new seat)				

=== Goldsmid ===
Goldsmid (3)
Party	Candidate	Votes	%	±%
Conservative	Anne Giebeler	1,521	10.92	
Labour Co-op	Simon Battle	1,495	10.73	
Labour Co-op	Vincent Meegan	1,490	10.70	
Labour Co-op	Frieda Warman-Brown	1,463	10.50	
Conservative	Steven Harmer-Strange	1,456	10.45	
Conservative	Brian Rowe	1,451	10.42	
Liberal Democrats	Bob Bailey	1,100	7.90	
Liberal Democrats	Josephine Lake	1,019	7.32	
Green	Susan Board	881	6.33	
Liberal Democrats	Ronald Bakere	877	6.30	
Green	Jenny Deadman	633	4.55	
Green	Gordon Hudson	541	3.88	
Turnout			43.73	+9.73
Conservative hold				
Labour Co-op gain from Conservative				
Labour Co-op gain from Conservative				

=== Hangleton and Knoll ===
Hangleton & Knoll (3)
Party	Candidate	Votes	%	±%
Labour Co-op	Brian Fitch	2,550	15.25	
Labour Co-op	Gerry Kielty	2,394	14.32	
Conservative	Peter Willows	2,449	14.65	
Conservative	Dawn Barnett	2,315	13.85	
Labour Co-op	James Edward	2,175	13.01	
Conservative	Stephen Wade	2,123	12.70	
Liberal Democrats	David Sears	517	3.09	
Liberal Democrats	Emily Pearson	477	2.85	
Green	Lucette Forrest	448	2.68	
Liberal Democrats	Lee Shingles	434	2.60	
Green	Jean Jones	270	1.62	
Socialist Alliance	Maggie Clifford	210	1.26	
Green	Matthew Dunton	207	1.24	
Independent	Gregory M^{c}Ausland	149	0.89	
Turnout			56.31	
Labour Co-op win (new seat)				
Labour Co-op win (new seat)				
Conservative win (new seat)				

=== Hanover and Elm Grove ===
Hanover & Elm Grove (3)
Party	Candidate	Votes	%	±%
Green	Joseph Randall	2,198	16.05	
Green	Georgia Wrighton	1,895	13.84	
Labour Co-op	Joyce Edmond-Smith	1,886	13.77	
Labour Co-op	John Ballance	1,722	12.57	
Labour Co-op	John Newington	1,510	11.03	
Green	Robert Jarrett	1,382	10.09	
Liberal Democrats	Diana Owen	517	3.77	
Conservative	James Roochove	489	3.57	
Conservative	Luke McCabe	466	3.40	
Liberal Democrats	Martin Lindsay-Hills	460	3.36	
Conservative	Peter Neish	455	3.32	
Liberal Democrats	Graham Hunnable	450	3.29	
Socialist Alliance	David Fellows	266	1.94	
Turnout			44.76	
Green win (new seat)				
Green win (new seat)				
Labour Co-op win (new seat)				

=== Hollingbury and Stanmer ===
Hollingbury and Stanmer (3)
Party	Candidate	Votes	%	±%
Labour Co-op	Jeane Lepper	1,882	16.36	
Labour Co-op	Pat Hawkes	1,711	14.88	
Labour Co-op	Tehmtan Framroze	1,680	14.61	
Conservative	Carol Ramsden	1,006	8.75	
Conservative	Roger McCabe	977	8.49	
Conservative	Michael Weatherley	914	7.95	
Green	Anthony Ackroyd	669	5.82	
Liberal Democrats	Matthew Barker	494	4.30	
Green	Amelia Mills	478	4.16	
Liberal Democrats	Ellen Woolley	457	3.97	
Liberal Democrats	Hector Gow	375	3.26	
Green	Steven Sorrell	339	2.95	
Independent	Anthony Greenstein	329	2.86	
Socialist Labour	Ian Fyvie	190	1.65	
Turnout			37.91	
Labour Co-op win (new seat)				
Labour Co-op win (new seat)				
Labour Co-op win (new seat)				

=== Moulsecoomb and Bevendean ===
Moulcoomb and Bevendean (3)
Party	Candidate	Votes	%	±%
Labour Co-op	Francis Tonks	1,659	15.48	
Labour Co-op	Anne Meadows	1,635	15.25	
Labour	Jack Hazelgrove	1,632	15.23	
Conservative	Joan Champion	933	8.70	
Conservative	Brian Dando	903	8.43	
Conservative	Martin Smith	891	8.31	
Liberal Democrats	Andrea Bain	614	5.73	
Green	Kate Chapman	539	5.03	
Liberal Democrats	Paul Durden	500	4.66	
Liberal Democrats	Bernard Huggins	495	4.62	
Green	Barry Mills	399	3.72	
Green	Ian Needham	322	3.00	
UKIP	Ian Hills	197	1.84	
Turnout			36.91	
Labour Co-op win (new seat)				
Labour Co-op win (new seat)				
Labour win (new seat)				

=== North Portslade ===
North Portslade (2)
Party	Candidate	Votes	%	±%
Labour Co-op	Robert Carden	1,897	29.37	
Labour Co-op	Donald Turner	1,755	27.17	
Conservative	Timothy Catt	863	13.36	
Conservative	Harinder Gill	728	11.27	
Liberal Democrats	Ann Barnard	408	6.32	
Liberal Democrats	Anthony Barnard	350	5.42	
Green	Deborah McElroy	307	4.75	
Green	Guy Richardson	152	2.35	
Turnout			48.12	+11.52
Labour Co-op hold				
Labour Co-op hold				

=== Patcham ===
Patcham (3)
Party	Candidate	Votes	%	±%
Conservative	Brian Pidgeon	3,120	19.66	
Conservative	Carol Theobald	3,003	18.93	
Conservative	Geoffrey Theobald	2,970	18.72	
Labour Co-op	Derek Betts	1,421	8.96	
Labour Co-op	William Chalmers	1,083	6.83	
Labour Co-op	Phillip Jones	1,057	6.66	
Liberal Democrats	Daphne Latimer	736	4.64	
Liberal Democrats	David Latimer	702	4.42	
Liberal Democrats	John Lovatt	580	3.66	
Green	Elizabeth Fakhr	436	2.75	
Green	Geraldine Keenan	392	2.47	
Green	Alison Varey	367	2.31	
Turnout			53.22	+1.02
Conservative hold				
Conservative hold				
Conservative hold				

=== Preston Park ===
Preston Park (3)
Party	Candidate	Votes	%	±%
Green	George Mallender	1,951	13.43	
Labour Co-op	Juliet McCaffery	1,623	11.18	
Labour Co-op	Kevin Allen	1,551	10.68	
Green	Alison Plaumer	1,462	10.07	
Labour Co-op	Michael Middleton	1,448	9.97	
Green	Laurence Littman	1,342	9.24	
Conservative	Andrew Garrood	919	6.33	
Liberal Democrats	Christopher Anderson	885	6.09	
Liberal Democrats	Birgit Gutheridge	871	6.00	
Conservative	Marie-Anne Bezencon	856	5.89	
Conservative	Pamela Stiles	827	5.69	
Liberal Democrats	Trefor Hunter	788	5.43	
Turnout			49.91	
Green win (new seat)				
Labour Co-op win (new seat)				
Labour Co-op win (new seat)				

=== Queen's Park ===
Queens Park (3)
Party	Candidate	Votes	%	±%
Labour Co-op	Kenneth Bodfish	1,713	13.51	
Labour Co-op	Simon Burgess	1,647	12.99	
Labour Co-op	Delia Forester	1,614	12.73	
Green	Nigel Tart	1,147	9.05	
Conservative	Robin Cecil	947	7.47	
Conservative	Patricia Smith	922	7.27	
Conservative	Michael Williams	911	7.19	
Green	Mjka Scott	895	7.06	
Green	Rebecca Whale	810	6.39	
Liberal Democrats	Elizabeth Robinson	775	6.11	
Liberal Democrats	Joseph Blease	695	5.48	
Liberal Democrats	Douglas Janke	602	4.75	
Turnout			41.48	+9.18
Labour Co-op hold				
Labour Co-op hold				
Labour Co-op hold				

=== Regency ===
Regency (2)
Party	Candidate	Votes	%	±%
Liberal Democrats	Dawn Davidson	770	15.51	
Labour Co-op	Roy Pennington	736	14.82	
Liberal Democrats	Kevin Donnelly	731	14.72	
Labour Co-op	Michael Fisher	720	14.50	
Green	Ian Poyser	696	14.02	
Conservative	John Hutchinson	464	9.35	
Conservative	Joyce Pidgeon	435	8.76	
Green	Hugh Miller	413	8.32	
Turnout			35.10	+8
Liberal Democrats gain from Labour Co-op				
Labour Co-op hold				

=== Rottingdean Coastal ===
Rottingdean Coastal (3)
Party	Candidate	Votes	%	±%
Conservative	Lynda Hyde	3,270	20.61	
Conservative	David Smith	2,910	18.34	
Conservative	Mary Mears	2,880	18.15	
Labour Co-op	Norman William	940	5.92	
Labour Co-op	Roger Page	839	5.29	
Liberal Democrats	Harold DeSouza	805	5.07	
Liberal Democrats	Joy DeSouza	805	5.07	
Green	Geoffrey Bowden	749	4.72	
Labour Co-op	Hitesh Tailor	744	4.69	
Liberal Democrats	Lisa Winter	591	3.72	
Green	Susan Gilson	545	3.44	
Green	Gregory Taylor	474	2.99	
BNP	Renzo Ferrari	314	1.98	
Turnout			53.76	
Conservative win (new seat)				
Conservative win (new seat)				
Conservative win (new seat)				

=== South Portslade ===
South Portslade (2)
Party	Candidate	Votes	%	±%
Labour Co-op	Leslie Hamilton	1,347	23.23	
Labour Co-op	Sue John	1,085	18.71	
Conservative	Richard Biggs	835	14.40	
Independent	Steve Collier	804	13.86	
Conservative	Michael Long	718	12.38	
Liberal Democrats	Nicola Searle	303	5.23	
Liberal Democrats	Neville Searle	287	4.95	
Green	Christopher Fry	214	3.69	
Green	Janette Ackroyd	206	3.55	
Turnout			46.61	+10.81
Labour Co-op hold				
Labour Co-op hold				

=== Stanford ===
Stanford (2)
Party	Candidate	Votes	%	±%
Conservative	Vanesse Brown	2,497	31.39	
Independent	Jayne Bennett	1,771	22.27	
Conservative	Michael Switzer	1,700	21.37	
Labour Co-op	Patrick Gill	467	5.87	
Labour Co-op	Nicole Murphy	436	5.48	
Liberal Democrats	Roy Alldred	417	5.24	
Liberal Democrats	Peter Denyer	275	3.46	
Green	Alan Pegg	241	3.03	
Green	Molly Taylor	150	1.89	
Turnout			55.94	+16.94
Conservative hold				
Independent gain from Conservative				

=== St Peter's and North Laine ===
St Peter's and North Laine (3)
Party	Candidate	Votes	%	±%
Green	Keith Taylor	2,347	17.27	
Green	Susan Paskins	2,266	16.68	
Green	Simon Williams	2,254	16.59	
Labour Co-op	Christine Simpson	1,200	8.83	
Labour Co-op	Harry Spillman	1,103	8.12	
Labour Co-op	Robert Stephenson	1,094	8.05	
Liberal Democrats	Madelaine Hunter	637	4.69	
Liberal Democrats	Ruth Berry	627	4.61	
Liberal Democrats	William Parker	517	3.81	
Conservative	Paul Bowes	474	3.49	
Conservative	Carole Franklin	474	3.49	
Conservative	James Gowans	471	3.47	
Independent	Gerald O’Brien	123	0.91	
Turnout			40.59	
Green win (new seat)				
Green win (new seat)				
Green win (new seat)				

=== Westbourne ===
Westbourne (2)
Party	Candidate	Votes	%	±%
Conservative	Brian Oxley	1,482	23.06	
Conservative	Denise Cobb	1,431	22.27	
Labour Co-op	Don Brown	904	14.07	
Labour Co-op	David Jones	813	12.65	
Liberal Democrats	Valerie Paynter	661	10.28	
Liberal Democrats	Brian Ralfe	553	8.60	
Green	Philip Dymond	358	5.57	
Green	Anita Phillips	225	3.50	
Turnout			46.93	+8.13
Conservative hold				
Conservative hold				

=== Wish ===
Wish (2)
Party	Candidate	Votes	%	±%
Conservative	Garry Dunn	1,616	22.96	
Conservative	Edward Kemble	1,522	21.63	
Labour Co-op	Heather James	1,368	19.44	
Labour Co-op	Patrick Murphy	1,242	17.65	
Liberal Democrats	Stephen Potts	454	6.45	
Green	Susan Baumgardt	324	4.60	
Liberal Democrats	Robert Stockman	296	4.21	
Green	Elizabeth Wakefield	215	3.06	
Turnout			55.05	+8.35
Conservative gain from Labour Co-op				
Conservative hold				

=== Withdean ===
Withdean (3)
Party	Candidate	Votes	%	±%
Conservative	Patricia Drake	2,800	17.07	
Conservative	Ann Norman	2,758	16.81	
Conservative	Kenneth Norman	2,726	16.62	
Labour Co-op	Iain Findlay	1,192	7.27	
Labour Co-op	Jane Peckham	1,135	6.92	
Labour Co-op	Gareth Jones	1,073	6.54	
Liberal Democrats	Peter Garratt	1,000	6.10	
Liberal Democrats	Donald McBeth	930	5.67	
Liberal Democrats	Derek Hall	895	5.46	
Green	James Lea	745	4.54	
Green	Lynn MacKenzie	680	4.14	
Green	Fiona Williams	472	2.88	
Turnout			53.74	
Conservative win (new seat)				
Conservative win (new seat)				
Conservative win (new seat)				

=== Woodingdean ===
Woodingdean (2)
Party	Candidate	Votes	%	±%
Conservative	Geoffrey Wells	2,500	32.26	
Conservative	Deirdre Simson	2,456	31.69	
Labour Co-op	Raymond Blackwood	956	12.34	
Labour Co-op	Malcolm Prescott	885	11.42	
Liberal Democrats	Season Prater	289	3.73	
Liberal Democrats	Tim Prater	292	3.77	
Green	Stella Pentecost	218	2.81	
Green	Paul Ward	153	1.97	
Turnout			55.33	+1.03
Conservative hold				
Conservative hold				
