= 1999 Brighton and Hove Borough Council election =

1999 UK local government election

← 1996	6 May 1999	2003 →

All 78 seats to Brighton and Hove Borough Council 40 seats needed for a majority

	First party	Second party
Party	Labour	Conservative
Last election	54 seats, 51.0%	22 seats, 35.5%
Seats won	45	27
Seat change	▼9	▲5
Popular vote	91,796	75,049
Percentage	45.8%	37.4%
Swing	▼5.2%	▲1.9%
	Third party	Fourth party
Party	Green	Liberal Democrats
Last election	1 seat, 4.1%	0 seats, 7.8%
Seats won	3	3
Seat change	▲2	▲3
Popular vote	22,084	10,499
Percentage	11.0%	5.2%
Swing	▲6.9%	▼2.6%
- Winner of each seat at the 1999 Brighton and Hove Borough Council election
Council control before election
Labour
Council control after election
Labour

The 1999 Brighton and Hove Borough Council election was held on 6 May 1999 to elect members of Brighton and Hove Borough Council in East Sussex, England.

Labour retained control of the council.

== Summary ==
=== Election result ===
1999 Brighton and Hove Borough Council election
Party	Candidates	Seats	Gains	Losses	Net gain/loss	Seats %	Votes %	Votes	+/−
Labour	78	45	0	9	▼9	57.7	45.8	91,796	–5.2
Conservative	76	27	5	0	▲5	34.6	37.4	75,049	+1.9
Green	77	3	2	0	▲2	3.8	11.0	22,084	+6.9
Liberal Democrats	31	3	3	0	▲3	3.8	5.2	10,499	–2.6
Independent Labour	1	0	0	0	Steady	0.0	0.3	524	N/A
Independent	2	0	0	0	Steady	0.0	0.1	279	N/A
Socialist Labour	2	0	0	0	Steady	0.0	0.1	154	N/A
Ind. Conservative	2	0	0	1	▼1	0.0	0.1	128	–1.3

== Ward results ==
=== Brunswick and Adelaide ===
A sitting councillor for this ward defected from Labour to the Scottish National Party prior to the election.

Brunswick and Adelaide (3)
Party	Candidate	Votes	%	±%
Liberal Democrats	Elgood P.	887	37.5	+5.3
Liberal Democrats	Davidson D. Ms.	866	36.6	+6.9
Liberal Democrats	Watkins D.	840	35.5	+6.7
Labour	Davies C. *	783	33.1	–7.3
Labour	Hunt F. Ms.*	755	31.9	–7.6
Labour	Trainer P.	746	31.5	–4.6
Conservative	Hunter S. Ms.	448	18.9	–7.3
Conservative	Boustead C.	444	18.8	–7.1
Conservative	Lilley P.	431	18.2	–6.8
Green	Jester M.	228	9.6	–0.3
Green	Nightingale K.	148	6.3	N/A
Green	Taylor M. Ms.	136	5.7	N/A
Ind. Conservative	Furness N.	80	3.4	N/A
Ind. Conservative	Hogan V. Ms.	48	2.0	N/A
Turnout		2,366	28.9	–1.8
Registered electors		8,186		
Liberal Democrats gain from Labour				
Liberal Democrats gain from Labour				
Liberal Democrats gain from Labour				

=== Goldsmid ===
Goldsmid (3)
Party	Candidate	Votes	%	±%
Conservative	Langston J. Ms.*	1,346	51.8	+2.3
Conservative	Langston S.*	1,276	49.2	+1.0
Conservative	Bennett J. Ms.	1,235	47.6	–0.5
Labour	Jones A.	904	34.8	–7.8
Labour	Collins R.	878	33.8	–7.8
Labour	Neiman S.	871	33.6	–6.0
Green	Hayes S. Ms.	280	10.8	+2.4
Green	Hudson G.	181	7.0	N/A
Green	Rowland E. Ms.	139	5.4	N/A
Turnout		2,596	34.0	–2.7
Registered electors		7,635		
Conservative hold				
Conservative hold				
Conservative hold				

=== Hangleton ===
Hangleton (3)
Party	Candidate	Votes	%	±%
Conservative	Willows P.	1,269	44.0	+4.2
Labour	Kielty G.*	1,170	40.6	–11.3
Conservative	Barnard M.	1,169	40.5	+1.5
Conservative	Ross K. Ms.	1,163	40.3	+1.7
Labour	Curtis D. Ms.	1,086	37.7	–10.1
Labour	Thompson J.	1,042	36.1	–11.4
Independent Labour	Newland D.*	524	18.2	N/A
Green	Robertson C. Ms.	175	6.1	+2.5
Green	Sellers C.	142	4.9	N/A
Green	Stent D.	111	3.8	N/A
Turnout		2,884	45.1	+2.0
Registered electors		6,395		
Conservative gain from Labour				
Labour hold				
Conservative gain from Labour				

=== Hanover ===
Hanover (3)
Party	Candidate	Votes	%	±%
Labour	Edmond-Smith J. Ms.*	1,671	56.7	–14.8
Labour	Harding J. Ms.	1,651	56.0	–11.8
Labour	Morley C.	1,343	45.6	–15.3
Green	Miller H.	804	27.3	+4.7
Green	Lloyd Jones A.	592	20.1	N/A
Green	Hodd J. Ms	582	19.8	N/A
Liberal Democrats	Bowden R.	351	11.9	+1.8
Conservative	Smith P. Ms.	329	11.2	–1.7
Conservative	Moorhouse D. Ms.	328	11.1	–0.4
Conservative	Pacifico C. Ms.	276	9.4	–1.5
Turnout		2,946	34.1	–0.6
Registered electors		8,639		
Labour hold				
Labour hold				
Labour hold				

=== Hollingbury ===
Hollingbury (3)
Party	Candidate	Votes	%	±%
Labour	Lepper J. Ms.	1,559	58.9	–19.0
Labour	Fitch B.*	1,450	54.8	–19.3
Labour	Simpson C. Ms.*	1,393	52.6	–19.2
Conservative	Brooker G.	459	17.3	+1.5
Conservative	Franklin C. Ms.	422	15.9	+0.4
Conservative	Norman K.	405	15.3	+0.5
Green	Maddicks R.	334	12.6	+1.2
Green	Timson C.	229	8.7	N/A
Liberal Democrats	Cotton E.	226	8.5	–2.5
Liberal Democrats	Lamb D.	203	7.7	–0.3
Socialist Labour	Fyvie I.	91	3.4	N/A
Socialist Labour	McLeod J.	63	2.4	N/A
Turnout		2,647	34.7	+2.6
Registered electors		7,627		
Labour hold				
Labour hold				
Labour hold				

=== Kings Cliff ===
Kings Cliff (3)
Party	Candidate	Votes	%	±%
Labour	Duncan I.*	1,366	56.4	–10.1
Labour	Mitchell G. Ms.	1,268	52.4	–12.1
Labour	Brewer B. Ms.	1,264	52.2	–13.9
Conservative	Burns C. Ms.	599	24.7	–2.1
Conservative	Radford D. Ms.*	570	23.5	–1.5
Conservative	Lawrence H. Ms.	551	22.8	–2.1
Green	Hyde-Park A.	365	15.1	+5.2
Green	Jones N.	269	11.1	N/A
Green	Lyddon E. Ms.	233	9.6	N/A
Liberal Democrats	Robinson E. Ms.	212	8.8	–0.4
Turnout		2,421	33.6	–1.8
Registered electors		7,205		
Labour hold				
Labour hold				
Labour hold				

=== Marine ===
Marine (3)
Party	Candidate	Votes	%	±%
Labour	Marsh M. Ms.*	1,376	60.4	+1.3
Labour	Allen K.	1,331	58.4	+1.0
Labour	Shelly C. Ms.	1,301	57.1	+1.2
Conservative	Mears M. Ms.	1,061	46.6	+2.6
Conservative	Dean C.	951	41.7	+1.5
Conservative	Williams M.	949	41.6	+1.8
Liberal Democrats	Lindsay-Hills M.	167	7.3	+1.2
Green	Abrahams I. Ms.	161	7.1	+1.3
Green	Howarth D.	115	5.0	N/A
Green	Sims A. Ms.	97	4.3	N/A
Turnout		2,746	32.8	+3.6
Registered electors		8,373		
Labour hold				
Labour hold				
Labour hold				

=== Moulsecoomb ===
Moulsecoomb (3)
Party	Candidate	Votes	%	±%
Labour	Meadows A. Ms.*	1,184	54.1	–8.8
Labour	Tonks F.*	1,171	53.5	–8.4
Labour	Hazelgrove J.	1,163	53.2	–5.2
Conservative	Maskell N.	502	23.0	–0.3
Conservative	Middleton M. Ms.	483	22.1	–0.8
Liberal Democrats	Woolley E. Ms.	157	7.2	–3.1
Green	Mills A. Ms.	121	5.5	–1.8
Green	Mills B.	95	4.3	N/A
Green	Vecpuisis J. Ms.	67	3.1	N/A
Turnout		2,187	32.7	+5.6
Registered electors		6,688		
Labour hold				
Labour hold				
Labour hold				

=== Nevill ===
Nevill (3)
Party	Candidate	Votes	%	±%
Conservative	Lewis P.*	1,292	50.8	+0.5
Conservative	Worgan M.*	1,273	50.1	±0.0
Conservative	Wade S.	1,232	48.4	+1.0
Labour	Gill P.	950	37.4	–7.4
Labour	Meegan V.	899	35.4	–9.1
Labour	Rosen H.	791	31.1	–9.5
Liberal Democrats	Alldred R.	212	8.3	+1.6
Green	Forrest L.	179	7.0	+2.6
Green	Coyne B. Ms.	107	4.2	N/A
Green	Gardner P.	95	3.7	N/A
Turnout		2,543	39.3	–6.0
Registered electors		6,471		
Conservative hold				
Conservative hold				
Conservative hold				

=== North Portslade ===
North Portslade (3)
Party	Candidate	Votes	%	±%
Labour	Carden R.*	1,676	61.2	–9.1
Labour	Steer H.*	1,615	59.0	–9.9
Labour	Turner D.	1,552	56.7	–10.2
Conservative	Britton J.	753	27.5	+1.6
Conservative	Pett D.	704	25.7	+0.9
Green	Ackroyd A.	161	5.9	–0.5
Green	Stringer J. Ms.	111	4.1	N/A
Green	Doust T.	102	3.7	N/A
Turnout		2,737	36.6	+1.5
Registered electors		7,478		
Labour hold				
Labour hold				
Labour hold				

=== Patcham ===
Patcham (3)
Party	Candidate	Votes	%	±%
Conservative	Theobald G.*	2,075	56.1	–3.2
Conservative	Theobald C. Ms.*	2,071	56.0	–3.2
Conservative	Sheldon J.*	2,038	55.1	–2.0
Labour	Betts D.	1,141	30.9	+0.3
Labour	Spicer F.	1,044	28.2	–2.4
Labour	Stewart E. Ms.	979	26.5	–1.1
Liberal Democrats	Latimer D. Ms.	309	8.4	–4.5
Green	Gaventa J.	208	5.6	+2.9
Green	Mackenzie L. Ms.	135	3.7	N/A
Green	Kennan G. Ms.	129	3.5	N/A
Turnout		3,698	52.2	–0.3
Registered electors		7,084		
Conservative hold				
Conservative hold				
Conservative hold				

=== Portslade South ===
Portslade South (3)
Party	Candidate	Votes	%	±%
Labour	Hamilton L.*	1,549	61.6	+0.4
Labour	Collier S.*	1,540	61.2	+2.2
Labour	John S. Ms.*	1,385	55.0	+0.5
Conservative	Newberry-Martin D.	495	19.7	–7.2
Conservative	H. Ms.	450	17.9	–8.9
Conservative	Older A. Ms.	400	15.9	–10.0
Liberal Democrats	Donovan N.	273	10.9	–0.5
Liberal Democrats	Freeman J.	197	7.8	–3.4
Green	Andrews S.	141	5.6	+2.0
Green	Gray K.	132	5.2	N/A
Green	Morgan H. Ms.	124	4.9	N/A
Turnout		2,516	35.8	–2.6
Registered electors		7,029		
Labour hold				
Labour hold				
Labour hold				

=== Preston ===
Preston (3)
Party	Candidate	Votes	%	±%
Labour	Macaffery J. Ms.*	1,562	41.8	–10.4
Labour	Austin L. Ms.*	1,551	41.5	–10.4
Labour	Spray J. Ms.*	1,464	39.2	–11.7
Conservative	Mendoza M.	1,304	34.9	–1.7
Conservative	Day C.	1,298	34.7	–1.8
Conservative	Parker L.	1,287	34.4	–2.1
Green	Littman L.	472	12.6	+5.2
Green	Marsh T. Ms.	351	9.4	N/A
Liberal Democrats	Potts S.	344	9.2	–0.5
Liberal Democrats	Hunter T.	339	9.1	+0.6
Green	Ware J. Ms.	303	8.1	N/A
Liberal Democrats	Schelwald E.	281	7.5	+0.1
Turnout		3,738	47.3	+2.4
Registered electors		7,903		
Labour hold				
Labour hold				
Labour hold				

=== Queens Park ===
Queens Park (3)
Party	Candidate	Votes	%	±%
Labour	Lythell J. Ms.*	1,223	56.9	–10.7
Labour	Bodfish K.*	1,221	56.8	–8.5
Labour	Charleton S.	1,132	52.7	–11.5
Conservative	Vivian S. Ms.*	468	21.8	–4.1
Conservative	Grinsted M. Ms.	429	20.0	–5.0
Conservative	Wells S. Ms.	406	18.9	–4.5
Green	Burgess D.	354	16.5	+5.0
Green	Fox C. Ms.	257	12.0	N/A
Liberal Democrats	Blease J. Ms	218	10.1	+2.0
Green	Holden D.	194	9.0	N/A
Turnout		2,150	32.3	–5.7
Registered electors		6,655		
Labour hold				
Labour hold				
Labour hold				

=== Regency ===
Regency (3)
Party	Candidate	Votes	%	±%
Labour	Joy S. Ms.	1,077	51.4	–7.8
Labour	Pennington R.*	999	47.7	–6.8
Labour	Warmington J.*	949	45.3	–8.2
Green	McLellan A.	484	23.1	+9.9
Conservative	BezenCon M. Ms.	454	21.7	–7.9
Conservative	Ramsden C. Ms.	441	21.1	–7.8
Conservative	Smith A. Ms.	404	19.3	–9.0
Green	Plocki S.	297	14.2	N/A
Liberal Democrats	Freeman T.	294	14.0	+4.2
Green	Taylor K.	241	11.5	N/A
Independent	Wing T.	165	7.9	N/A
Turnout		2,095	27.1	–9.2
Registered electors		7,731		
Labour hold				
Labour hold				
Labour hold				

=== Rottingdean ===
Rottingdean (3 seats)
Party	Candidate	Votes	%	±%
Conservative	B. Hunt*	2,232	61.0	+6.2
Conservative	L. Hyde	2,129	58.1	+3.5
Conservative	D. Smith	2,090	57.1	+3.8
Labour	M. Bunting	697	19.0	–5.6
Labour	J. Moriarty	670	18.3	–4.7
Labour	A. Avis	611	16.7	–5.8
Liberal Democrats	M. Hampton	535	14.6	–0.2
Liberal Democrats	J. De Souza	369	10.1	–4.7
Liberal Democrats	H. Desouza	360	9.8	–3.9
Green	V. Kelley	245	6.7	+3.1
Green	A. Gilson	177	4.8	N/A
Green	N. Tart	137	3.7	N/A
Turnout		3,662	46.2	+4.5
Registered electors		7,927		
Conservative hold				
Conservative hold				
Conservative hold				

=== Seven Dials ===
Seven Dials
Party	Candidate	Votes	%	±%
Labour	L. Gwyn-Jones*	1,222	51.6	–24.4
Labour	A. Hermititge	1,145	48.4	–23.4
Labour	M. Middleton*	1,103	46.6	–25.0
Green	J. Berrington	619	26.1	+10.8
Green	B. Holmes	440	18.6	N/A
Conservative	J. Gowans	435	18.1	–0.2
Conservative	P. Bowes	428	18.1	–0.5
Conservative	R. Larkin	402	17.0	–0.6
Liberal Democrats	B. Huggins	324	13.7	+2.2
Green	I. Needham	312	13.2	N/A
Turnout		2,368	29.8	–2.0
Registered electors		7,946		
Labour hold				
Labour hold				
Labour hold				

=== St Peters ===
St Peters (3 seats)
Party	Candidate	Votes	%	±%
Green	Pete West*	1,715	51.1	+9.2
Green	R. Child	1,498	44.7	+18.8
Green	Keith Taylor	1,488	44.4	+21.9
Labour	D. Newman	1,302	38.8	–1.6
Labour	S. Prentice	1,258	37.5	–1.1
Labour	H. Spillman	1,250	37.3	–0.2
Conservative	R. Cripps	271	8.1	–0.2
Conservative	E. Maclean	262	7.8	+0.9
Conservative	I. Maclean	237	7.1	+0.8
Liberal Democrats	W. Parker	190	5.7	+0.4
Turnout		3,353	42.3	–7.8
Registered electors		7,926		
Green hold				
Green gain from Labour				
Green gain from Labour				

=== Stanford ===
Stanford (3 seats)
Party	Candidate	Votes	%	±%
Conservative	V. Brown	1,680	64.2	–2.7
Conservative	D. Bennet	1,626	62.2	–2.7
Conservative	B. Rowe*	1,161	44.4	–20.5
Labour	D. Jackson	782	29.9	+9.6
Labour	A. Walshe	724	27.7	+8.1
Labour	R. Jenkins	687	26.3	+6.8
Green	G. Richardson	225	8.6	+4.7
Green	J. La Masurier	225	8.6	N/A
Green	P. Stone	91	3.5	N/A
Turnout		2,616	39.0	+2.5
Registered electors		6,708		
Conservative hold				
Conservative hold				
Conservative hold				

=== Stanmer ===
Stanmer (3 seats)
Party	Candidate	Votes	%	±%
Labour	T. Framoze*	1,372	46.9	–3.9
Labour	P. Hawkes	1,328	45.4	–5.2
Labour	G. Belshon	1,270	43.4	–6.0
Conservative	D. Careless	1,099	37.6	+8.2
Conservative	R. Macabe	1,029	35.2	+7.0
Conservative	B. Pidgeon	1,018	34.8	+7.6
Green	L. Clayden	260	8.9	+1.5
Liberal Democrats	J. Rimmington	238	8.1	–0.1
Green	K. Lench	157	5.4	N/A
Green	P. Tofts	117	4.0	N/A
Turnout		2,925	36.7	–3.5
Registered electors		7,971		
Labour hold				
Labour hold				
Labour hold				

=== Tenantry ===
Tenantry
Party	Candidate	Votes	%	±%
Labour	Steve Bassam*	1,423	57.5	–10.9
Labour	J. Ballance	1,326	53.6	–9.6
Labour	A. Durr*	1,260	50.9	–12.3
Conservative	B. Dando	441	17.8	–7.1
Green	K. Chapman	436	17.6	+7.2
Conservative	I. Middleton	423	17.1	–6.1
Conservative	D. Read	397	16.0	–6.0
Green	P. Mulligan	323	13.0	N/A
Green	H. Rawlinson	254	10.3	N/A
Liberal Democrats	P. Weller	239	9.7	+0.1
Turnout		2,476	31.7	–1.9
Registered electors		7,809		
Labour hold				
Labour hold				
Labour hold				

=== Vallance ===
Vallance
Party	Candidate	Votes	%	±%
Labour	S. Battle*	1,066	44.5	–4.1
Labour	B. Walshe*	1,018	42.5	–5.4
Labour	F. Brown*	966	40.4	–6.7
Conservative	A. Milward	889	37.2	–1.1
Conservative	J. Frankland	889	37.2	–0.9
Conservative	J. Young	858	35.9	–1.1
Liberal Democrats	P. Denyer	396	16.5	+7.3
Green	M. Abrahams	329	13.7	+7.1
Green	M. Mueller	199	8.3	N/A
Green	J. Porter	171	7.1	N/A
Independent	D. Biggs	114	4.8	N/A
Turnout		2,393	32.1	–3.5
Registered electors		7,454		
Labour hold				
Labour hold				
Labour hold				

=== Westbourne ===
Westbourne (3 seats)
Party	Candidate	Votes	%	±%
Conservative	B. Oxley*	1,305	46.2	–1.0
Conservative	D. Cobb	1,270	45.0	–0.8
Conservative	E. Kemble	1,242	44.0	N/A
Labour	V. Vizor	1,091	38.6	–0.4
Labour	M. Fisher	1,043	36.9	–1.5
Labour	J. Newington	1,002	35.5	–1.8
Liberal Democrats	J. Lake	299	10.6	–1.2
Green	N. Baker	292	10.3	+5.9
Green	J. Da Costa	201	7.1	N/A
Green	V. Powell	136	4.8	N/A
Turnout		2,824	38.8	+3.5
Registered electors		7,277		
Conservative gain from Ind. Conservative				
Conservative hold				
Conservative hold				

=== Westdene ===
Westdene (3 seats)
Party	Candidate	Votes	%	±%
Conservative	J. Drake*	1,845	53.2	+6.2
Conservative	P. Drake*	1,821	52.5	+6.4
Conservative	A. Norman*	1,775	51.2	+8.2
Labour	S. Kidd	972	28.0	–11.8
Labour	K. Martin	842	24.3	–15.5
Labour	J. Patterson	811	23.4	–13.0
Green	E. Huckle	377	10.9	+5.6
Liberal Democrats	J. Lovatt	336	9.7	+2.8
Liberal Democrats	D. McBeth	310	8.9	+2.6
Green	P. Poole	206	5.9	N/A
Green	S. Sorrell	178	5.1	N/A
Turnout		3,469	45.2	–2.6
Registered electors		7,675		
Conservative hold				
Conservative hold				
Conservative hold				

=== Wish ===
Wish (3 seats)
Party	Candidate	Votes	%	±%
Labour	H. James*	1,393	43.9	–7.3
Conservative	G. Peltz-Dunn	1,366	43.1	–1.2
Labour	P. Murphy*	1,356	42.7	–4.5
Conservative	S. Conway	1,347	42.5	–0.3
Conservative	R. Balchin	1,340	42.2	–0.3
Labour	A. Pratt*	1,299	41.0	–5.7
Green	S. Dickens	281	8.9	+2.0
Liberal Democrats	B. Murray	260	8.2	–1.1
Green	J. Henton	171	5.4	N/A
Green	K. Rowe	138	4.4	N/A
Turnout		3,172	46.7	+5.9
Registered electors		6,792		
Labour hold				
Conservative gain from Labour				
Labour hold				

=== Woodingdean ===
Woodingdean (3 seats)
Party	Candidate	Votes	%	±%
Conservative	G. Wells*	2,045	50.5	+2.3
Conservative	P. Stiles*	1,900	46.9	+1.5
Conservative	D. Simson	1,857	45.8	+1.2
Labour	J. Moorhouse*	1,670	41.2	–7.8
Labour	R. Blackwood	1,431	35.3	–6.2
Labour	L. Barraclough	1,381	34.1	–5.6
Liberal Democrats	P. Edwards	267	6.6	–3.1
Green	J. Cummings	223	5.5	+1.3
Green	S. Field	155	3.8	N/A
Green	E. Humphries	127	3.1	N/A
Turnout		4,053	54.3	+9.4
Registered electors		7,464		
Conservative hold				
Conservative hold				
Conservative gain from Labour				
