= 1995 Brighton Borough Council election =

1995 UK local government election

← 1994	4 May 1995	1996 (Brighton & Hove) →

16 out of 47 seats to Brighton Borough Council 24 seats needed for a majority

	First party	Second party
Party	Labour	Conservative
Last election	25 seats, 49.6%	22 seats, 32.6%
Seats won	13	3
Seats after	27	20
Seat change	▲2	▼2
Popular vote	26,001	13,875
Percentage	55.7%	29.7%
Swing	▲6.1%	▼2.9%
- Winner of each seat at the 1995 Brighton Borough Council election
Council control before election
Labour
Council control after election
Labour

The 1995 Brighton Borough Council election took place on 4 May 1995 to elect members of Brighton Borough Council in East Sussex, England. This was on the same day as other local elections.

== Summary ==
=== Election result ===
1995 Brighton Borough Council election
Party	This election			Full council			This election		
Party	Seats	Net	Seats %	Other	Total	Total %	Votes	Votes %	+/−
Labour	13	▲2	81.3	14	27	57.4	26,001	55.7	+6.1
Conservative	3	▼2	18.8	17	20	42.6	13,875	29.7	–2.9
Liberal Democrats	0	Steady	0.0	0	0	0.0	4,317	9.2	–3.9
Green	0	Steady	0.0	0	0	0.0	2,254	4.8	+0.5
Militant Labour	0	Steady	0.0	0	0	0.0	195	0.4	±0.0
Independent	0	Steady	0.0	0	0	0.0	35	0.1	N/A
Natural Law	0	Steady	0.0	0	0	0.0	22	<0.1	N/A

== Ward results ==
=== Hanover ===
Hanover
Party	Candidate	Votes	%	±%
Labour	S. Schaffer*	2,187	73.6	+7.6
Conservative	D. Dudeney	339	11.4	–3.2
Liberal Democrats	B. Huggins	225	7.6	–3.7
Green	K. Chapman	221	7.4	–0.7
Majority		1,848	62.2	+10.7
Turnout		2,972	37.0	–3.4
Registered electors		7,984		
Labour hold		Swing	▲5.4	

=== Hollingbury ===
Hollingbury
Party	Candidate	Votes	%	±%
Labour	B. Fitch*	1,987	71.1	+5.6
Conservative	A. Stammers	474	17.0	–4.9
Liberal Democrats	D. Lamb	228	8.2	–1.3
Green	C. Foulser	104	3.7	+0.6
Majority		1,513	54.2	+10.6
Turnout		2,793	38.0	–4.7
Registered electors		7,376		
Labour hold		Swing	▲5.3	

=== Kings Cliff ===
Kings Cliff
Party	Candidate	Votes	%	±%
Labour	S. Burgess	1,807	66.4	+10.0
Conservative	E. Radford-Kirby	625	23.0	–6.0
Liberal Democrats	M. Jones	196	7.2	–2.8
Green	J. Hodd	92	3.4	–1.2
Majority		1,182	43.5	+16.1
Turnout		2,720	41.0	–3.3
Registered electors		6,664		
Labour hold		Swing	▲8.0	

=== Marine ===
Marine
Party	Candidate	Votes	%	±%
Labour	M. Marsh	1,414	53.0	+2.0
Conservative	B. Fairs	838	31.4	–1.3
Militant Labour	J. Apps	195	7.3	+1.2
Liberal Democrats	E. Reed	158	5.9	–2.1
Green	B. Coyne	61	2.3	±0.0
Majority		576	21.6	+3.3
Turnout		2,666	34.0	–8.1
Registered electors		7,850		
Labour hold		Swing	▲1.7	

=== Moulescombe ===
Moulescombe
Party	Candidate	Votes	%	±%
Labour	F. Tonks*	1,331	69.5	+9.5
Conservative	J. Stevens	371	19.4	–5.3
Liberal Democrats	J. Bowskill	158	8.3	–4.2
Green	J. Berrington	55	2.9	±0.0
Majority		960	50.1	+14.8
Turnout		2,666	29.0	–2.9
Registered electors		6,567		
Labour hold		Swing	▲7.4	

=== Patcham ===
Patcham
Party	Candidate	Votes	%	±%
Conservative	G. Theobald	1,647	44.5	–2.5
Labour	K. Allen	1,295	35.0	+5.2
Liberal Democrats	J. De Souza	710	19.2	–1.6
Green	A. Haase	45	1.2	–1.2
Majority		352	9.5	–7.7
Turnout		3,697	53.0	+4.8
Registered electors		6,963		
Conservative hold		Swing	▼3.9	

=== Preston ===
Preston
Party	Candidate	Votes	%	±%
Labour	J. Lepper	2,089	52.9	–0.3
Conservative	D. Radford*	1,424	36.1	+9.9
Liberal Democrats	T. Hunter	319	8.1	–8.3
Green	L. Littman	118	3.0	–1.1
Majority		665	16.8	–10.2
Turnout		3,950	52.0	+8.8
Registered electors		7,614		
Labour gain from Conservative		Swing	▼5.1	

=== Queens Park ===
Queens Park
Party	Candidate	Votes	%	±%
Labour	J. Townsend*	1,638	64.3	+5.7
Conservative	R. Ruzyllo	587	23.1	–6.0
Liberal Democrats	J. Blease	200	7.9	–0.4
Green	S. Chadwick	99	3.9	–0.1
Natural Law	R. Bradshaw	22	0.9	N/A
Majority		1,051	41.3	+11.8
Turnout		2,546	41.0	–6.6
Registered electors		6,245		
Labour hold		Swing	▲5.9	

=== Regency ===
Regency
Party	Candidate	Votes	%	±%
Labour	N. Ping*	1,550	60.4	+8.5
Conservative	J. Cameron	670	26.1	–3.6
Liberal Democrats	E. Cotton	218	8.5	–4.3
Green	L. Robinson	130	5.1	–0.6
Majority		880	34.3	+12.1
Turnout		2,568	37.0	–5.2
Registered electors		6,970		
Labour hold		Swing	▲6.1	

=== Rottingdean ===
Rottingdean
Party	Candidate	Votes	%	±%
Conservative	S. Radford-Kirby	1,784	58.1	–3.8
Labour	J. Moriarty	759	24.7	+8.3
Liberal Democrats	D. Davidson	470	15.3	–4.0
Green	E. Robinson	58	1.9	–0.6
Majority		1,025	33.4	–9.2
Turnout		3,071	41.0	–3.3
Registered electors		7,582		
Conservative hold		Swing	▼6.1	

=== Seven Dials ===
Seven Dials
Party	Candidate	Votes	%	±%
Labour	N. Robinson*	1,815	65.1	+6.8
Conservative	A. Norman	392	14.1	–3.3
Liberal Democrats	R. Heale	332	11.9	–5.9
Green	I. Needham	213	7.6	+1.1
Independent	G. O'Brien	35	1.3	N/A
Majority		1,423	51.1	+10.5
Turnout		2,787	39.0	–0.9
Registered electors		7,151		
Labour hold		Swing	▲5.1	

=== St Peters ===
St Peters
Party	Candidate	Votes	%	±%
Labour	L. Gwyn-Jones*	1,776	60.4	–4.1
Green	P. West	642	21.8	+11.6
Conservative	C. Ramsden	338	11.5	–3.2
Liberal Democrats	M. Fairweather	183	6.2	–4.3
Majority		1,134	38.6	–11.2
Turnout		2,939	40.0	–3.0
Registered electors		7,291		
Labour hold		Swing	▼7.9	

=== Stanmer ===
Stanmer
Party	Candidate	Votes	%	±%
Labour	P. Hawkes*	1,662	61.7	+12.3
Conservative	C. Franklin	753	28.0	–10.3
Liberal Democrats	C. Cornelius	201	7.5	–2.4
Green	P. Tofts	77	2.9	+0.5
Majority		909	33.8	+22.7
Turnout		2,693	36.0	–12.6
Registered electors		7,519		
Labour hold		Swing	▲11.3	

=== Tenantry ===
Tenantry
Party	Candidate	Votes	%	±%
Labour	A. Durr*	1,704	65.4	+8.6
Conservative	D. Dudeney	559	21.5	–6.6
Liberal Democrats	M. Mylton-Thorley	179	6.9	–3.2
Green	J. Davies	164	6.3	+1.3
Majority		1,145	43.9	+15.3
Turnout		2,606	35.0	–6.4
Registered electors		7,354		
Labour hold		Swing	▲7.6	

=== Westdene ===
Westdene
Party	Candidate	Votes	%	±%
Conservative	H. Drake*	1,490	47.1	–3.7
Labour	S. Prentice	1,281	40.5	+11.9
Liberal Democrats	D. McBeth	305	9.6	–7.5
Green	G. Keenan	89	2.8	–0.7
Majority		209	6.6	–15.6
Turnout		3,165	44.0	+0.3
Registered electors		7,159		
Conservative hold		Swing	▼7.8	

=== Woodingdean ===
Woodingdean
Party	Candidate	Votes	%	±%
Labour	J. Moorhouse	1,706	47.2	+11.7
Conservative	G. Wells	1,584	43.9	–4.0
Liberal Democrats	E. Oldfield	235	6.5	–8.3
Green	D. Groves	86	2.4	+0.5
Majority		122	3.4	N/A
Turnout		3,611	48.0	+3.1
Registered electors		7,477		
Labour gain from Conservative		Swing	▲7.9	
