= 1995 Hove Borough Council election =

1995 UK local government election

← 1991	4 May 1995	1996 (Brighton & Hove) →

All 30 seats to Hove Borough Council 16 seats needed for a majority

	First party	Second party	Third party
Party	Labour	Conservative	Liberal Democrats
Seats won	16	11	3
Seat change	▲10	▼10	Steady
Popular vote	32,969	24,620	11,281
Percentage	46.3%	34.6%	15.8%
Swing	▲21.4%	▼12.6%	▼9.6%
Council control before election
Conservative
Council control after election
Labour

The 1995 Hove Borough Council election took place on 4 May 1995 to elect members of Hove Borough Council in East Sussex, England. This was on the same day as other local elections.

== Summary ==
=== Election result ===
1995 Hove Borough Council election
Party	Candidates	Seats	Gains	Losses	Net gain/loss	Seats %	Votes %	Votes	+/−
Labour	30	16	10	0	▲10	53.3	46.3	32,969	+21.4
Conservative	25	11	0	10	▼10	36.7	34.6	24,620	–12.6
Liberal Democrats	29	3	0	0	Steady	10.0	15.8	11,281	–9.6
Green	10	0	0	0	Steady	0.0	2.1	1,524	+0.9
Ind. Conservative	3	0	0	0	Steady	0.0	1.0	728	–0.3
Independent	1	0	0	0	Steady	0.0	0.1	56	N/A

== Ward results ==
=== Brunswick & Adelaide ===
Brunswick & Adelaide (3 seats)
Party	Candidate	Votes	%	±%
Liberal Democrats	B. Bailey*	1,054	44.2	
Liberal Democrats	J. Hillman*	919	38.5	
Liberal Democrats	J. Wakeling*	871	36.5	
Labour	H. James	667	28.0	
Labour	G. Gergory	640	26.8	
Labour	S. Lord	596	25.0	
Conservative	J. Mitchell	536	22.5	
Conservative	S. Hunter	536	22.5	
Conservative	D. Timmins	494	20.7	
Green	S. Tonkin	140	5.9	
Independent	D. Parr	56	2.3	
Turnout		2,386	32.2	
Registered electors		7,411		
Liberal Democrats hold				
Liberal Democrats hold				
Liberal Democrats hold				

=== Goldsmid ===
Goldsmid (3 seats)
Party	Candidate	Votes	%	±%
Conservative	J. Langston*	1,272	46.7	
Conservative	S. Langston*	1,233	45.3	
Conservative	B. Jordan*	1,223	44.9	
Labour	N. Pitkeathly	882	32.4	
Labour	D. Taylor	882	32.4	
Labour	P. Trainer	798	29.3	
Green	G. Hudson	363	13.3	
Liberal Democrats	M. Thomas	343	12.6	
Liberal Democrats	C. Spicer	333	12.2	
Liberal Democrats	B. Driffil	324	11.9	
Turnout		2,724	38.4	
Registered electors		7,093		
Conservative hold				
Conservative hold				
Conservative hold				

=== Hangleton ===
Hangleton (3 seats)
Party	Candidate	Votes	%	±%
Labour	G. Kielty	1,437	51.2	
Labour	A. Richards	1,281	45.7	
Labour	B. Walshe	1,275	45.5	
Conservative	P. Willows*	1,046	37.3	
Conservative	H. Daniels	977	34.8	
Conservative	G. Matthews*	939	33.5	
Liberal Democrats	D. Innes	283	10.1	
Liberal Democrats	R. Newell	255	9.1	
Liberal Democrats	P. Bickle	240	8.6	
Green	O. McElroy	93	3.3	
Turnout		2,804	43.9	
Registered electors		6,388		
Labour gain from Conservative				
Labour gain from Conservative				
Labour gain from Conservative				

=== Nevill ===
Nevill (3 seats)
Party	Candidate	Votes	%	±%
Conservative	J. Marshall*	1,242	48.4	
Labour	D. Anthony	1,087	42.4	
Conservative	S. Antunovich	1,035	40.3	
Labour	C. Davies	1,034	40.3	
Labour	W. Roper	1,017	39.6	
Conservative	T. Catt*	1,003	39.1	
Liberal Democrats	D. Storey	219	8.5	
Liberal Democrats	E. Alldred	214	8.3	
Liberal Democrats	E. Bates	209	8.1	
Green	C. Timson	91	3.5	
Turnout		2,566	41.1	
Registered electors		6,244		
Conservative hold				
Labour gain from Conservative				
Conservative hold				

=== Portslade North ===
Portslade North (3 seats)
Party	Candidate	Votes	%	±%
Labour	L. Hamilton*	1,846	76.9	
Labour	L. Hamilton*	1,775	73.9	
Labour	R. Carden*	1,651	68.8	
Conservative	A. Burton	307	12.8	
Liberal Democrats	S. O'Kane	211	8.8	
Liberal Democrats	A. Percy	169	7.0	
Green	K. Gray	137	5.7	
Turnout		2,401	35.2	
Registered electors		6,821		
Labour hold				
Labour hold				
Labour hold				

=== Portslade South ===
Portslade South (3 seats)
Party	Candidate	Votes	%	±%
Labour	S. Collier*	1,778	70.8	
Labour	I. Caplin*	1,660	66.1	
Labour	S. John	1,550	61.7	
Liberal Democrats	I. James	496	19.8	
Liberal Democrats	M. Walls	381	15.2	
Liberal Democrats	G. O'Kane	335	13.3	
Green	H. Morgan	197	7.8	
Turnout		2,511	36.7	
Registered electors		6,842		
Labour hold				
Labour hold				
Labour hold				

=== Stanford ===
Stanford (3 seats)
Party	Candidate	Votes	%	±%
Conservative	M. Adams*	1,439	61.8	
Conservative	B. Rowe*	1,394	59.9	
Conservative	J. Kapp	1,381	59.3	
Labour	P. Kennedy	520	22.3	
Labour	S. Robinson	519	22.3	
Labour	D. Newland	505	21.7	
Liberal Democrats	K. Bates	300	12.9	
Liberal Democrats	P. Walls	278	11.9	
Liberal Democrats	M. Storey	265	11.4	
Green	M. Jester	95	4.1	
Turnout		2,328	36.2	
Registered electors		6,431		
Conservative hold				
Conservative hold				
Conservative hold				

=== Vallance ===
Vallance (3 seats)
Party	Candidate	Votes	%	±%
Labour	M. Gibbling	1,059	44.7	
Labour	A. Walshe	1,032	43.6	
Labour	F. Warman-Brown	1,000	42.2	
Conservative	P. Martin*	775	32.7	
Conservative	G. Peltzer Dunn*	756	31.9	
Conservative	B. Sanders*	725	30.6	
Liberal Democrats	P. Vivian	272	11.5	
Liberal Democrats	E. Aziz	259	10.9	
Liberal Democrats	S. Taylor	234	9.9	
Ind. Conservative	G. Furness	198	8.4	
Ind. Conservative	V. Hogan	191	8.1	
Green	J. Da Costa	162	6.8	
Turnout		2,369	33.7	
Registered electors		7,030		
Labour gain from Conservative				
Labour gain from Conservative				
Labour gain from Conservative				

=== Westbourne ===
Westbourne (3 seats)
Party	Candidate	Votes	%	±%
Conservative	A. Buttimer*	1,149	40.6	
Conservative	V. Brown	1,064	37.6	
Conservative	B. Oxley	877	31.0	
Labour	G. Benians	872	30.8	
Labour	J. Thompson	787	27.8	
Labour	V. Vizor	782	27.6	
Liberal Democrats	J. Lake	703	24.8	
Liberal Democrats	P. Elgood	640	22.6	
Liberal Democrats	R. Slater	609	21.5	
Ind. Conservative	J. Furness	339	12.0	
Green	M. Mueller	117	4.1	
Turnout		2,833	40.1	
Registered electors		7,065		
Conservative hold				
Conservative hold				
Conservative hold				

=== Wish ===
Wish (3 seats)
Party	Candidate	Votes	%	±%
Labour	C. Bowden	1,417	48.3	
Labour	P. Murphy	1,320	45.0	
Labour	A. Pratt	1,300	44.3	
Conservative	P. Baker	1,088	37.1	
Conservative	S. Howse*	1,070	36.5	
Conservative	B. Flint	1,059	36.1	
Liberal Democrats	J. Freeman	318	10.8	
Liberal Democrats	J. Storey	314	10.7	
Liberal Democrats	M. Mayahi	233	7.9	
Green	D. McElroy	129	4.4	
Turnout		2,932	43.8	
Registered electors		6,695		
Labour gain from Conservative				
Labour gain from Conservative				
Labour gain from Conservative				
