= Borough of Hove =

District of East Sussex (1974–1997)

Coordinates: 50.8283°N 0.1704°W

Hove
- Population
  - 1981: 84,740
  - 1992: 90,400
- History
  - Created: 1974
  - Abolished: 1997
  - Succeeded by: Brighton and Hove
- Status: non-metropolitan district, borough

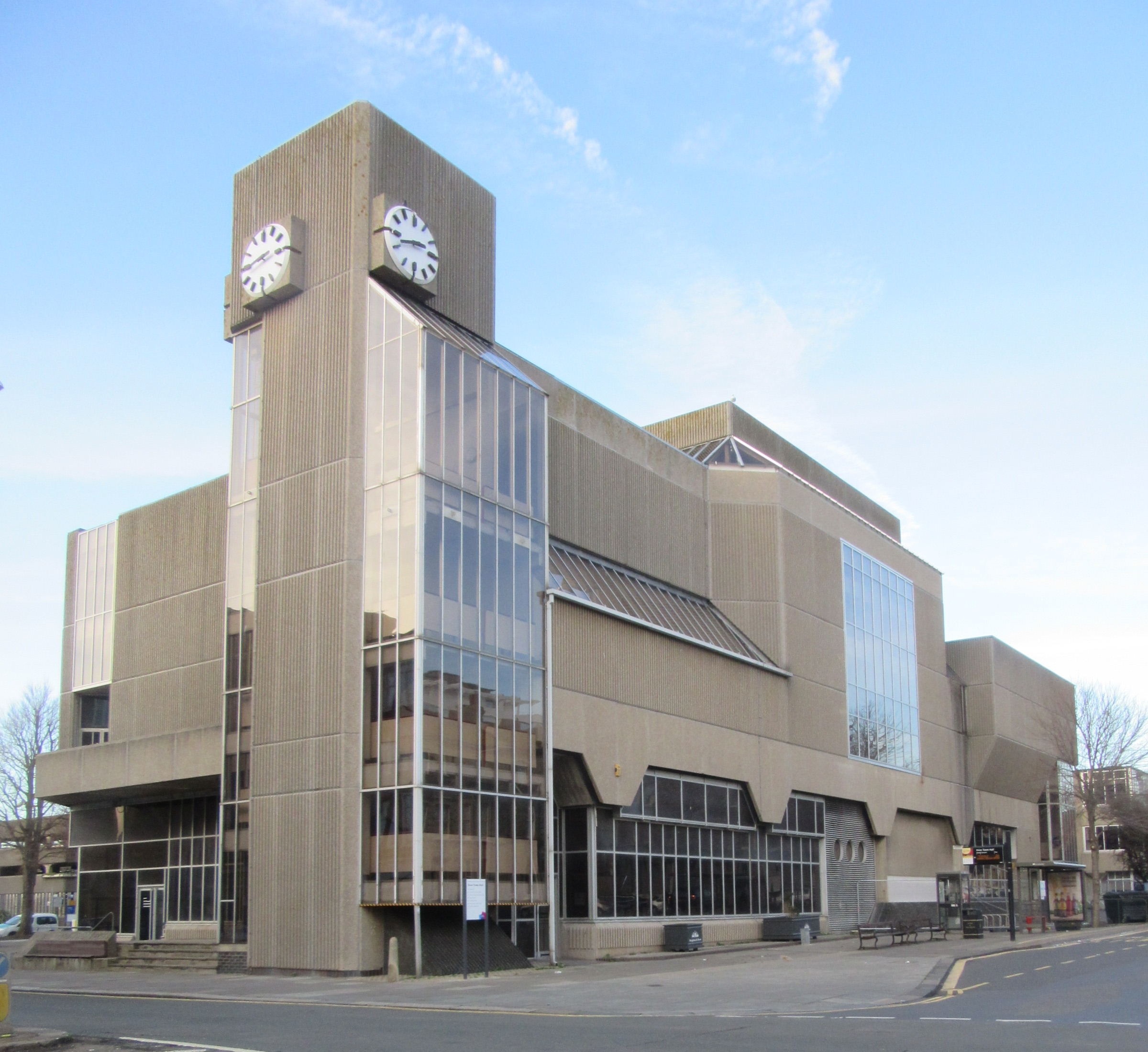
Hove Town Hall

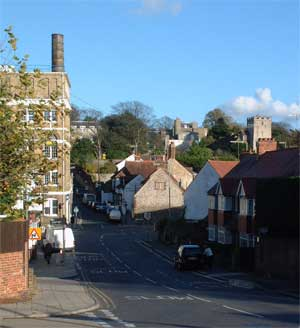
Portslade

Hove was a non-metropolitan district with borough status of East Sussex, England. The district contained the unparished areas of Hove and Portslade-by-Sea. In 1997 it merged with the Borough of Brighton to become the Borough of Brighton and Hove. The population of the borough was recorded as 84,740 in 1981 and 90,400 in 1992. The borough council was based at Hove Town Hall, although part of Portslade Town Hall (the headquarters of the defunct Portslade Urban District) continued to be used for council purposes as well.

== History ==
Hove became an urban district in 1894, a year after amalgamating with the parish of Aldrington to the west. It was then incorporated as a Municipal borough in August 1898. Its boundaries were extended in 1928 when parts of various neighbouring parishes were absorbed. Portslade was a large and ancient parish further west, within the Rural district of Steyning East. It had grown rapidly in the 19th century and by 1894 made up nearly half of the rateable value of the rural district, while having disproportionately little representation on its council. Proposals to turn it into an urban district were made at public inquiry on 7 August 1895, and Portslade Urban District was formed on 1 April 1898.

The first indication that the two urban districts of Hove and Portslade could merge came in 1948 when the Boundary Commission recommended this approach, but nothing happened at the time. A plan to create a county borough consisting of Brighton, Hove, Portslade, Southwick and Shoreham-by-Sea was announced in 1963, but any merger between Hove and its larger eastern neighbour Brighton was considered unpopular: Brighton had tried to annex Hove on several occasions, starting in 1854, but Hove's residents were said to be "strongly in favour of independent municipal government". (Note: As late as 1946, the Sussex Daily News stated that "Everybody connected with its administration is utterly opposed to Hove being the satellite of any other borough. It is willing to be enlarged but not to be absorbed.)

The district was formed on 1 April 1974 under the Local Government Act 1972 from the municipal borough of Hove and Portslade-by-Sea urban district.

In 1994, the proposal to amalgamate the boroughs of Brighton and Hove and form a new unitary authority was announced. At the time, 19 of Hove's 30 councillors were opposed to the plans, as were three-quarters of the borough's residents; but on 1 April 1997 the district was abolished and merged with Brighton to form "Brighton and Hove" which is a unitary authority thus not governed by East Sussex County Council.

When the borough was created it had 12 wards, each represented by three councillors, but the Boundary Commission imposed changes two years later. Between 1976 and the amalgamation with Brighton in 1997 the borough had ten wards, each represented by three councillors: Brunswick/Adelaide, Goldsmid, Hangleton, Nevill, Portslade North, Portslade South, Stanford, Vallance, Westbourne and Wish.

== See also ==
- Hove Borough Council elections

== Bibliography ==
- Middleton, Judy (2002). The Encyclopaedia of Hove & Portslade. Brighton: Brighton & Hove Libraries.
