= Keith Taylor (British politician) =

British politician (1953–2022)

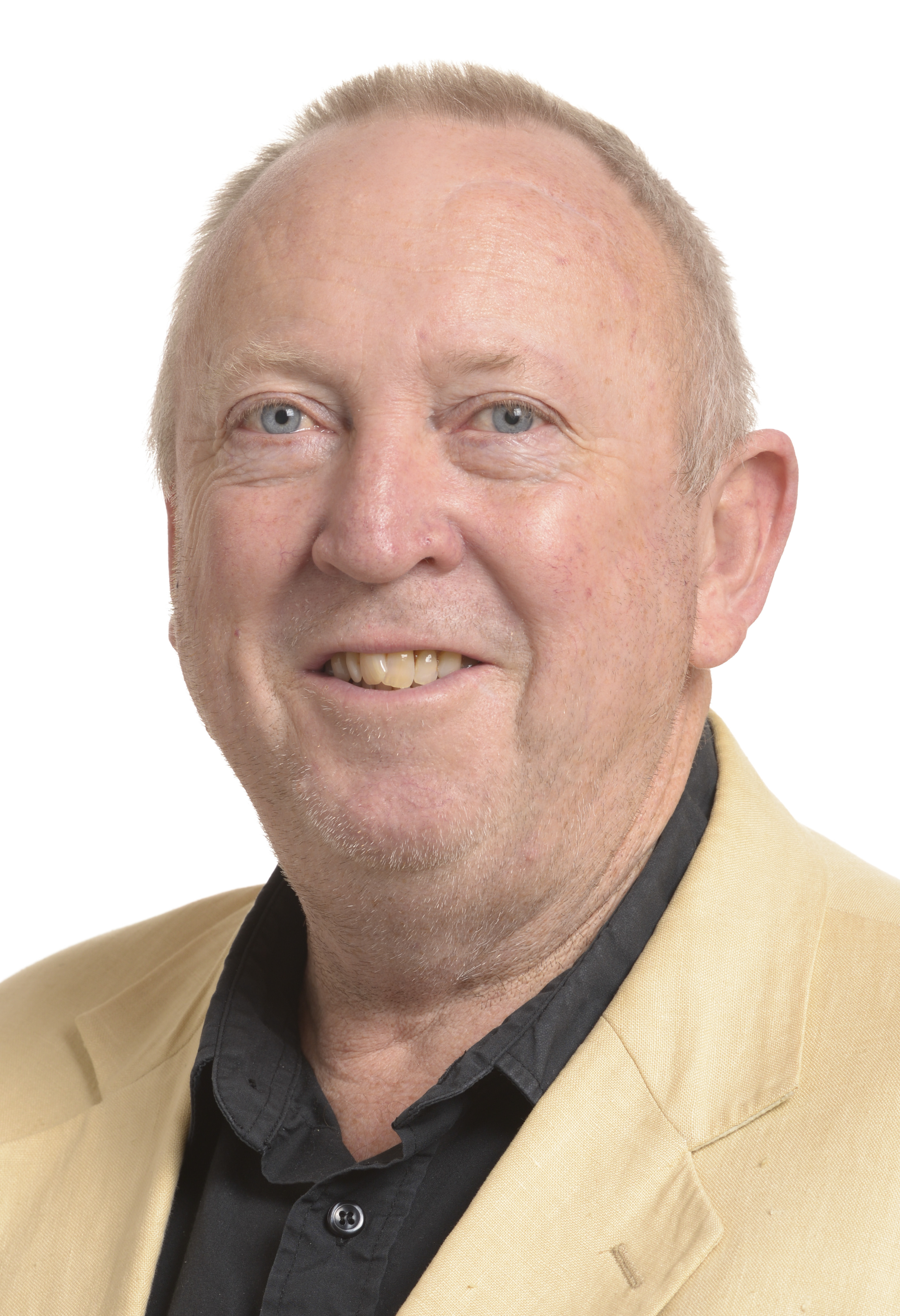

Principal Speaker of the Green Party of England and Wales
- In office 6 August 2004 – 24 November 2006 Serving with Caroline Lucas
- Preceded by: Mike Woodin
- Succeeded by: Derek Wall

Member of the European Parliament for South East England
- In office 6 May 2010 – 1 July 2019
- Preceded by: Caroline Lucas
- Succeeded by: Alexandra Phillips

Brighton and Hove City Councillor for St Peter's and North Laine Ward
- In office 6 May 1999 – 6 May 2010
- Succeeded by: Lizzie Deane

Personal details
- Born: Keith Richard Taylor; 1 August 1953 Rochford, Essex, England
- Died: 31 October 2022 (aged 69)
- Party: Green Party of England and Wales

Keith Richard Taylor (1 August 1953 – 31 October 2022) was a Green Party of England and Wales politician who was MEP for South East England from 2010 to 2019 and was the Party's animal rights spokesperson until his retirement in 2019. He was one of the two Principal Speakers of the party from August 2004 to November 2006.

== Early career ==
Before becoming a Green Party activist, Taylor lived in Brighton and owned a local business. Taylor "took to community activism opposing an inappropriate local development", leading him to join the Green Party. Taylor was a participant in the campaign by BUDD, opposing the development now called the New England Quarter adjacent to Brighton railway station.

He spoke up against the Council's under-funding and budget cut to the Palmiera Project, a residential home for severely autistic children and wrote about it in a chapter of the book Greens for Europe.

== Green Party councillor and parliamentary candidate ==
In 1999, Taylor was elected as a councillor on Brighton and Hove Borough Council, representing the St Peter's ward. He became 'Convenor' (the local group's name for its leader) of the Green group on the council. During his time as a councillor Taylor was a member of the Policy & Resources Committee, the Adult Social Care & Health Committee, the Housing Committee, the Joint Commissioning Board, the Shoreham Airport Joint Committee, the Housing Decision Procedures Scrutiny Panel and the Licensing & Regulatory Functions Sub-Committee.

Taylor stood in 2001 and 2005 as the parliamentary candidate for the Green Party in the Brighton Pavilion constituency. Taylor received 9.3% in 2001 and 21.9% of the vote in 2005.

In August 2004, Taylor was appointed a replacement for Mike Woodin as the Green Party's Male Principal Speaker alongside Caroline Lucas. The Guardian stated that Taylor "defies the stereotype of Green politicians as earnest or bookish academics". Taylor was confirmed in the post after a by-election in November 2005, beating Derek Wall by 851 votes to 803; again, serving alongside Lucas. Taylor had gained prominence for being, at the time, the Green Party's most successful parliamentary candidate in the UK, after winning 22% of the vote in the Brighton Pavilion constituency at the 2005 General Election. In November 2006, Taylor lost re-election to Wall by 767 votes to 705.

In 2007, Taylor faced Lucas to be selected as the Green Party's parliamentary candidate for the Brighton Pavilion constituency in the next general election. Taylor, on announcing his campaign, said, "This will be the third time I've contested this seat. I inherited a 2.6% vote for the Greens and have built that up to 22%. Next time, if I am selected again Brighton voters will make history in electing me the country's first Green MP". Lucas, in a letter to local party members, said that she had been invited to stand by several local members and described it as "the most difficult decision of my life" because of her "personal and family commitments" and her "loyalty and commitment to Keith Taylor, who is a person and a politician for whom I have great admiration and respect".

On 18 July 2007, it was announced that Lucas had been selected ahead of Taylor by the Brighton Green Party. Lucas won with 55% of the party ballot against Taylor's 45%. Taylor congratulated Lucas and pledged his support for her campaign.

In May 2009, Taylor was an early signatory of the International Simultaneous Policy (SIMPOL) which seeks to end the usual deadlock in tackling global issues.

== Member of European Parliament ==
On 6 May 2010, Lucas was elected as Member of Parliament for Brighton Pavilion and upon doing so was required to resign as the MEP for the South East of England. Taylor being second on the Green Party list was appointed Lucas' replacement to serve out the remainder of the term until 2014. Taylor was also required to resign as a local councillor under European Parliament rules on dual mandates. Taylor was reelected as MEP for the South East region in the 2014 Euro election, with 9.05% of the vote. He did not stand in the 2019 European election. In the European Parliament, he sat with the Greens–European Free Alliance.

== Bibliography ==
- Bennett, Natalie; Bütikofer, Reinhard; Jeraj, Samir; Jordan, Klina; Juniper, Tony; Lambert, Jean; Lucas, Caroline; Rüdig, Wolfgang; Scott Cato, Molly; Taylor, Keith (2019). Ward, Liam (ed.). Greens for a Better Europe: Twenty Years of Green Influence in the European Parliament, 1999-2019. London: London Publishing Partnership. ISBN 978-1-907994-88-3.

Political offices
Preceded by Mike Woodin	Principal Speaker of the Green Party of England and Wales; 2004–2006	Succeeded by Derek Wall
