= 1991 Hove Borough Council election =

1991 English local government election

The 1991 Hove Borough Council election took place on 2 May 1991 to elect members of Hove Borough Council in East Sussex, England. This was on the same day as other local elections.

== Ward results ==
=== Brunswick & Adelaide ===
Brunswick & Adelaide (3 seats)
Party	Candidate	Votes	%	±%
Liberal Democrats	B. Bailey*	1,834		
Liberal Democrats	J. Hillman*	1,667		
Liberal Democrats	J. Wakeling*	1,633		
Conservative	H. Allanson	852		
Conservative	J. Mitchell	804		
Conservative	M. Hess	776		
Labour	L. Braley	293		
Labour	S. Carden	222		
Labour	P. Trainer	222		
Turnout				
Registered electors		7,148		
Liberal Democrats hold				
Liberal Democrats hold				
Liberal Democrats hold				
