= Brighton Borough Council elections =

Local government elections in East Sussex, England

Brighton was a non-metropolitan district in East Sussex, England. It was abolished on 1 April 1997 and replaced by Brighton and Hove.

== Political control ==
From the first election to the council in 1973 until its abolition in 1997 political control of the council was held by the following parties:

Party in control	Years
Conservative	1973–1983
No overall control	1983–1988
Labour	1988–1997

=== Leadership ===
The last leader of the council, Steve Bassam, who had led the council from 1987, went on to be the first leader of the replacement authority, Brighton and Hove City Council.

Councillor	Party	From	To
Steve Bassam	Labour	1987	1997

== Council elections ==
Elections from 1973 to 1983 were for the whole council. Following the 1983 election, one-third of the council (one seat in each of the 16 three-member wards) was up for election each year, other than county council election years. There was no election in 1996: the councillors due for election in that year had their term of office extended up to the end of the borough council in April 1997.

- 1973 Brighton Borough Council election
- 1976 Brighton Borough Council election
- 1979 Brighton Borough Council election
- 1983 Brighton Borough Council election (New ward boundaries)
- 1984 Brighton Borough Council election
- 1986 Brighton Borough Council election
- 1987 Brighton Borough Council election
- 1988 Brighton Borough Council election
- 1990 Brighton Borough Council election
- 1991 Brighton Borough Council election
- 1992 Brighton Borough Council election
- 1994 Brighton Borough Council election
- 1995 Brighton Borough Council election
