= 1986 Brighton Borough Council election =

1986 UK local government election

← 1984	8 May 1986	1987 →

16 out of 48 seats to Brighton Borough Council 25 seats needed for a majority

	First party	Second party	Third party
Party	Labour	Conservative	Alliance
Last election	21 seats, 39.2%	23 seats, 42.3%	4 seats, 17.8%
Seats won	9	6	1
Seats after	23	21	4
Seat change	▲2	▼2	Steady
Popular vote	22,769	22,027	11,167
Percentage	40.5%	39.1%	19.8%
Swing	▲1.3%	▼3.2%	▲2.0%
- Winner of each seat at the 1986 Brighton Borough Council election
Council control before election
No overall control
Council control after election
No overall control

The 1986 Brighton Borough Council election took place on 8 May 1986 to elect members of Brighton Borough Council in East Sussex, England. This was on the same day as other local elections.

== Summary ==
=== Election result ===
1986 Brighton Borough Council election
Party	This election			Full council			This election		
Party	Seats	Net	Seats %	Other	Total	Total %	Votes	Votes %	+/−
Labour	9	▲2	56.3	14	23	47.9	22,769	40.5	+1.3
Conservative	6	▼2	37.5	15	21	43.8	22,027	39.1	–3.2
Alliance	1	Steady	6.3	3	4	8.3	11,167	19.8	+2.0
Green	0	Steady	0.0	0	0	0.0	288	0.5	–0.1
Independent	0	Steady	0.0	0	0	0.0	38	0.1	N/A

== Ward results ==
=== Hanover ===
Hanover
Party	Candidate	Votes	%	±%
Labour	J. Edmond-Smith	2,347	60.4	+17.0
Conservative	P. Holden	851	21.9	+8.8
Alliance	D. Lamb	651	16.7	–24.3
Independent	M. Whittaker	38	1.0	N/A
Majority		1,496	38.5	+36.1
Turnout		3,887	44.4	–5.9
Registered electors		8,753		
Labour hold		Swing	▲4.1	

=== Hollingbury ===
Hollingbury
Party	Candidate	Votes	%	±%
Labour	David Lepper*	1,848	58.0	+2.0
Conservative	J. Guy	794	24.9	–10.4
Alliance	C. Walker	546	17.1	+8.4
Majority		1,054	41.1	+20.4
Turnout		3,188	33.1	–11.3
Registered electors		7,753		
Labour hold		Swing	▲6.2	

=== Kings Cliff ===
Kings Cliff
Party	Candidate	Votes	%	±%
Labour	M. Johnson	1,796	50.0	+0.4
Conservative	M. Williamson*	1,432	39.8	–4.5
Alliance	M. Dennis	366	10.2	+4.1
Majority		364	10.1	+4.8
Turnout		3,594	53.0	+5.7
Registered electors		6,782		
Labour gain from Conservative		Swing	▲2.5	

=== Marine ===
Marine
Party	Candidate	Votes	%	±%
Labour	J. Allen	1,864	50.3	+4.6
Conservative	M. Furminger	1,496	40.4	–5.6
Alliance	V. Jones	347	9.4	+2.3
Majority		368	9.9	N/A
Turnout		3,707	47.4	+6.5
Registered electors		7,823		
Labour gain from Conservative		Swing	▲5.1	

=== Moulescombe ===
Moulescombe
Party	Candidate	Votes	%	±%
Labour	G. Wingate	1,477	61.1	+2.4
Conservative	M. Maine	516	21.3	–11.1
Alliance	V. Ware	425	17.6	+8.7
Majority		961	39.7	+13.4
Turnout		2,418	32.4	+2.1
Registered electors		7,465		
Labour hold		Swing	▲6.8	

=== Patcham ===
Patcham
Party	Candidate	Votes	%	±%
Conservative	J. Hutchinson	2,095	54.9	–1.4
Labour	D. Betts	1,006	26.4	±0.0
Alliance	N. Cook	714	18.7	+1.5
Majority		1,089	28.5	–1.4
Turnout		3,815	52.6	+9.4
Registered electors		7,250		
Conservative hold		Swing	▼0.7	

=== Preston ===
Preston
Party	Candidate	Votes	%	±%
Conservative	G. West	1,888	42.2	–2.7
Alliance	B. Champion	1,635	36.5	+4.8
Labour	S. Schaffer	955	21.3	–0.5
Majority		253	5.6	N/A
Turnout		4,478	55.8	+10.5
Registered electors		8,028		
Conservative hold		Swing	▼3.8	

=== Queens Park ===
Queens Park
Party	Candidate	Votes	%	±%
Labour	J. Lythell*	1,780	52.4	–4.5
Conservative	M. Land	1,275	37.5	–5.6
Alliance	J. Cooke	341	10.0	N/A
Majority		505	14.9	+1.2
Turnout		3,396	52.7	+4.3
Registered electors		6,449		
Labour hold		Swing	▲0.6	

=== Regency ===
Regency
Party	Candidate	Votes	%	±%
Conservative	C. Giles*	1,370	44.4	+9.6
Labour	M. Brown	1,265	41.0	+8.3
Alliance	R. Heale	453	14.7	–15.8
Majority		105	3.4	+1.4
Turnout		3,088	45.1	+4.3
Registered electors		6,848		
Conservative hold		Swing	▲0.7	

=== Rottingdean ===
Rottingdean
Party	Candidate	Votes	%	±%
Conservative	R. Larkin*	2,722	66.4	–10.5
Alliance	S. Dore	1,021	24.9	+12.0
Labour	C. Lane	355	8.7	–1.5
Majority		1,701	41.5	–22.6
Turnout		4,098	52.1	+8.6
Registered electors		7,863		
Conservative hold		Swing	▼11.3	

=== Seven Dials ===
Seven Dials
Party	Candidate	Votes	%	±%
Alliance	F. Hix*	1,304	37.8	–0.8
Labour	F. Tonks	1,093	31.7	+6.5
Conservative	N. Gibbon	893	25.9	–5.8
Green	N. Collier	157	4.6	N/A
Majority		211	6.1	–1.4
Turnout		3,290	48.6	+8.8
Registered electors		7,086		
Alliance hold		Swing	▼3.7	

=== St Peters ===
St Peters
Party	Candidate	Votes	%	±%
Labour	C. Simpson*	1,657	49.2	+4.6
Conservative	T. Beale	850	25.2	–1.0
Alliance	J. Guyer	733	21.7	–5.1
Green	S. Watson	131	3.9	+1.6
Majority		807	23.9	+6.1
Turnout		3,371	46.4	+0.9
Registered electors		7,271		
Labour hold		Swing	▲2.8	

=== Stanmer ===
Stanmer
Party	Candidate	Votes	%	±%
Labour	T. Framroze	1,665	52.9	–1.6
Conservative	D. Fairhall	964	30.6	–7.1
Alliance	D. McBeth	521	16.5	+8.7
Majority		701	22.3	+5.5
Turnout		3,150	40.8	+0.8
Registered electors		7,723		
Labour hold		Swing	▲2.8	

=== Tenantry ===
Tenantry
Party	Candidate	Votes	%	±%
Labour	S. Bassam*	1,776	58.5	+4.7
Conservative	M. Toner	822	27.1	–9.9
Alliance	M. Gare-Simmons	436	14.4	+5.2
Majority		954	31.4	+14.5
Turnout		3,034	39.9	–1.9
Registered electors		7,595		
Labour hold		Swing	▲7.3	

=== Westdene ===
Westdene
Party	Candidate	Votes	%	±%
Conservative	M. Barratt	2,035	54.3	–8.3
Alliance	D. Roberts	1,079	28.3	+8.2
Labour	F. Spicer	694	18.2	±0.0
Majority		956	25.1	–16.5
Turnout		3,808	51.2	+10.4
Registered electors		7,437		
Conservative hold		Swing	▼8.3	

=== Woodingdean ===
Woodingdean
Party	Candidate	Votes	%	±%
Conservative	B. Grinsted*	2,024	53.1	–8.1
Labour	L. Williams	1,191	31.3	+0.5
Alliance	M. Rutherford	595	15.6	+7.6
Majority		833	21.9	–8.5
Turnout		3,810	47.7	+5.7
Registered electors		7,994		
Conservative hold		Swing	▼4.3	
