= 1988 Brighton Borough Council election =

1988 UK local government election

← 1987	5 May 1988	1990 →

16 out of 48 seats to Brighton Borough Council 25 seats needed for a majority

	First party	Second party	Third party
Party	Labour	Conservative	SLD
Last election	24 seats, 33.8%	21 seats, 46.8%	3 seats, 18.2%
Seats won	11	5	0
Seats after	27	19	2
Seat change	▲3	▼2	▼1
Popular vote	23,094	25,880	5,301
Percentage	42.0%	47.1%	9.6%
Swing	▲8.2%	▲0.3%	▼8.6%
- Winner of each seat at the 1988 Brighton Borough Council election
Council control before election
No overall control
Council control after election
Labour

The 1988 Brighton Borough Council election took place on 5 May 1988 to elect members of Brighton Borough Council in East Sussex, England. This was on the same day as other local elections.

== Summary ==
=== Election result ===
1988 Brighton Borough Council election
Party	This election			Full council			This election		
Party	Seats	Net	Seats %	Other	Total	Total %	Votes	Votes %	+/−
Labour	11	▲3	68.8	16	27	56.3	23,094	42.0	+8.2
Conservative	5	▼2	31.3	14	19	39.6	25,880	47.1	+0.3
SLD	0	▼1	0.0	2	2	4.2	5,301	9.6	–8.6
Green	0	Steady	0.0	0	0	0.0	688	1.3	+0.1

== Ward results ==
=== Hanover ===
Hanover
Party	Candidate	Votes	%	±%
Labour	R. Duncan*	2,162	58.3	+7.0
Conservative	C. Marten	1,139	30.7	–0.5
Green	G. Mills	257	6.9	+2.9
SLD	K. McArthur	153	4.1	–9.4
Majority		1,023	27.6	+7.5
Turnout		3,711	43.2	–1.9
Registered electors		8,589		
Labour hold		Swing	▲3.8	

=== Hollingbury ===
Hollingbury
Party	Candidate	Votes	%	±%
Labour	C. Morley*	1,957	55.4	+9.1
Conservative	N. Maskell	1,330	37.7	–2.5
SLD	D. Rudling	244	6.9	–4.6
Majority		627	17.8	+11.6
Turnout		3,531	45.6	–3.0
Registered electors		7,736		
Labour hold		Swing	▲5.8	

=== Kings Cliff ===
Kings Cliff
Party	Candidate	Votes	%	±%
Labour	G. Haynes*	1,802	50.7	+6.1
Conservative	K. Burns	1,596	44.9	–0.1
SLD	M. Dennis	156	4.4	–6.0
Majority		206	5.8	N/A
Turnout		3,554	52.1	–2.4
Registered electors		6,824		
Labour hold		Swing	▲3.1	

=== Marine ===
Marine
Party	Candidate	Votes	%	±%
Labour	H. Miller	1,979	52.8	+9.9
Conservative	D. Radford*	1,638	43.7	–5.2
SLD	V. Wares	132	3.5	–4.7
Majority		341	9.1	N/A
Turnout		3,749	48.0	–3.4
Registered electors		7,805		
Labour gain from Conservative		Swing	▲7.6	

=== Moulescombe ===
Moulescombe
Party	Candidate	Votes	%	±%
Labour	S. Hall	1,606	60.6	+14.3
Conservative	J. Stevens	882	33.3	–1.0
SLD	P. Vivvillacci	160	6.0	–13.4
Majority		724	27.3	+15.2
Turnout		2,648	35.9	–0.7
Registered electors		7,369		
Labour hold		Swing	▲7.7	

=== Patcham ===
Patcham
Party	Candidate	Votes	%	±%
Conservative	J. Peterson	2,200	63.0	–0.3
Labour	D. Betts	1,005	28.8	+10.1
SLD	L. Ashworth	288	8.2	–7.7
Majority		1,195	34.2	–10.4
Turnout		3,493	48.6	–8.7
Registered electors		7,186		
Conservative hold		Swing	▼5.2	

=== Preston ===
Preston
Party	Candidate	Votes	%	±%
Conservative	J. Leach*	1,883	44.4	–1.5
SLD	D. Champion	1,415	33.3	–5.1
Labour	R. Brown	757	17.8	+2.0
Green	K. Sinclair	188	4.4	N/A
Majority		468	11.0	+3.5
Turnout		4,243	53.1	–6.5
Registered electors		7,991		
Conservative hold		Swing	▲1.8	

=== Queens Park ===
Queens Park
Party	Candidate	Votes	%	±%
Labour	R. Stanton*	1,890	57.5	+8.8
Conservative	M. Land	1,396	42.5	+1.6
Majority		494	15.0	+7.3
Turnout		3,286	49.7	–2.2
Registered electors		6,609		
Labour hold		Swing	▲3.6	

=== Regency ===
Regency
Party	Candidate	Votes	%	±%
Labour	A. Winter	1,601	49.3	+8.2
Conservative	J. Cameron	1,486	45.8	+0.1
SLD	C. Berry	158	4.9	–8.4
Majority		115	3.5	N/A
Turnout		3,245	44.2	–5.6
Registered electors		7,346		
Labour gain from Conservative		Swing	▲4.1	

=== Rottingdean ===
Rottingdean
Party	Candidate	Votes	%	±%
Conservative	M. Cray	3,012	79.3	+3.2
SLD	P. Edwards	411	10.8	–7.0
Labour	K. Thomson	377	9.9	+3.8
Majority		2,601	68.4	+10.2
Turnout		3,800	47.5	–9.2
Registered electors		7,999		
Conservative hold		Swing	▲5.1	

=== Seven Dials ===
Seven Dials
Party	Candidate	Votes	%	±%
Labour	M. Thompson	1,227	38.2	+8.8
Conservative	T. Williamson	1,024	31.9	–0.1
SLD	R. Heale	962	29.9	–8.7
Majority		203	6.3	N/A
Turnout		3,213	43.6	–6.1
Registered electors		7,366		
Labour gain from Liberal Democrats		Swing	▲4.5	

=== St Peters ===
St Peters
Party	Candidate	Votes	%	±%
Labour	G. Sweeting	1,795	56.7	+12.9
Conservative	D. Cullen	962	30.4	–4.0
Green	I. Brodie	243	7.7	+0.5
SLD	M. Fairweather	166	5.2	–9.4
Majority		833	26.3	N/A
Turnout		3,166	43.1	–5.6
Registered electors		7,339		
Labour hold		Swing	▲8.5	

=== Stanmer ===
Stanmer
Party	Candidate	Votes	%	±%
Labour	R. Blackwood*	1,753	51.2	+8.7
Conservative	D. Fairhall	1,462	42.7	+2.6
SLD	R. Spencer	206	6.0	–11.4
Majority		291	8.5	+6.0
Turnout		3,421	45.6	–1.3
Registered electors		7,503		
Labour hold		Swing	▲3.1	

=== Tenantry ===
Tenantry
Party	Candidate	Votes	%	±%
Labour	R. Davies*	1,688	54.2	+9.8
Conservative	M. Toner	1,227	39.4	–0.3
SLD	C. Bracken	202	6.5	–9.5
Majority		461	14.8	+10.1
Turnout		3,117	41.0	–3.1
Registered electors		7,608		
Labour hold		Swing	▲5.1	

=== Westdene ===
Westdene
Party	Candidate	Votes	%	±%
Conservative	J. Humphrey	2,366	71.1	+9.5
Labour	F. Spicer	661	19.8	+8.2
SLD	D. McBeth	303	9.1	–15.6
Majority		1,705	51.2	+14.3
Turnout		3,330	44.4	–9.5
Registered electors		7,507		
Conservative hold		Swing	▲0.7	

=== Woodingdean ===
Woodingdean
Party	Candidate	Votes	%	±%
Conservative	A. Hill*	2,277	65.9	+4.4
Labour	I. Tettersell	834	24.1	+4.9
SLD	J. Marshall	345	10.0	–7.4
Majority		1,443	41.8	–0.5
Turnout		3,456	43.2	–11.2
Registered electors		7,996		
Conservative hold		Swing	▼0.3	
