= 1990 Brighton Borough Council election =

1990 UK local government election

← 1988	3 May 1990	1991 →

16 out of 48 seats to Brighton Borough Council 25 seats needed for a majority

	First party	Second party	Third party
Party	Labour	Conservative	Liberal Democrats
Last election	27 seats, 42.0%	19 seats, 47.1%	2 seats, 9.6%
Seats won	11	5	0
Seats after	29	18	1
Seat change	▲2	▼1	▼1
Popular vote	26,303	20,237	4,806
Percentage	45.9%	35.3%	8.4%
Swing	▲3.9%	▼11.8%	▼1.2%
- Winner of each seat at the 1990 Brighton Borough Council election
Council control before election
Labour
Council control after election
Labour

The 1990 Brighton Borough Council election took place on 3 May 1990 to elect members of Brighton Borough Council in East Sussex, England. This was on the same day as other local elections.

== Summary ==
=== Election result ===
1990 Brighton Borough Council election
Party	This election			Full council			This election		
Party	Seats	Net	Seats %	Other	Total	Total %	Votes	Votes %	+/−
Labour	11	▲2	68.8	18	29	60.4	26,303	45.9	+3.9
Conservative	5	▼1	31.3	13	18	37.5	20,237	35.3	–11.8
Liberal Democrats	0	▼1	0.0	1	1	2.1	4,806	8.4	–1.2
Green	0	Steady	0.0	0	0	0.0	5,822	10.2	+8.9
Independent	0	Steady	0.0	0	0	0.0	171	0.3	N/A

== Ward results ==
=== Hanover ===
Hanover
Party	Candidate	Votes	%	±%
Labour	J. Edmond-Smith*	2,399	64.9	+6.6
Conservative	M. Pead	620	16.8	–13.9
Green	H. De Lemos	465	12.6	+5.7
Liberal Democrats	K. McArthur	210	5.7	+1.6
Majority		1,779	48.2	+20.6
Turnout		3,694	44.9	+1.7
Registered electors		8,222		
Labour hold		Swing	▲10.3	

=== Hollingbury ===
Hollingbury
Party	Candidate	Votes	%	±%
Labour	David Lepper	2,170	60.9	+5.5
Conservative	J. Furness	755	21.2	–16.5
Liberal Democrats	D. Rudling	330	9.3	+2.4
Green	N. Collier	309	8.7	N/A
Majority		1,415	39.7	+21.9
Turnout		3,564	47.9	+2.3
Registered electors		7,445		
Labour hold		Swing	▲11.0	

=== Kings Cliff ===
Kings Cliff
Party	Candidate	Votes	%	±%
Labour	M. Johnson*	1,630	47.4	–3.3
Conservative	V. Marchant	1,289	37.5	–7.4
Liberal Democrats	M. Jones	269	7.8	+3.4
Green	P. Hodd	250	7.3	N/A
Majority		341	9.9	+4.1
Turnout		3,438	51.7	–0.4
Registered electors		6,645		
Labour hold		Swing	▲2.1	

=== Marine ===
Marine
Party	Candidate	Votes	%	±%
Labour	J. Allen*	1,910	56.3	+3.5
Conservative	D. Radford	1,083	31.9	–11.8
Green	S. Watson	217	6.4	N/A
Liberal Democrats	E. Reed	184	5.4	+1.9
Majority		827	24.4	+15.3
Turnout		3,394	45.4	–2.6
Registered electors		7,484		
Labour hold		Swing	▲7.7	

=== Moulescombe ===
Moulescombe
Party	Candidate	Votes	%	±%
Labour	R. Pennell	1,984	68.4	+7.8
Conservative	K. Gunn	500	17.2	–16.1
Liberal Democrats	A. Mackintosh	212	7.3	+1.3
Green	L. Robinson	205	7.1	N/A
Majority		1,484	51.2	+23.9
Turnout		2,901	41.6	+5.7
Registered electors		6,973		
Labour hold		Swing	▲12.0	

=== Patcham ===
Patcham
Party	Candidate	Votes	%	±%
Conservative	J. Hutchinson*	1,905	51.0	–12.0
Labour	T. Glading	1,147	30.7	+1.9
Liberal Democrats	P. Garratt	348	9.3	+1.1
Green	L. Littman	334	8.9	N/A
Majority		758	20.3	–13.9
Turnout		3,734	53.7	+5.1
Registered electors		6,950		
Conservative hold		Swing	▼7.0	

=== Preston ===
Preston
Party	Candidate	Votes	%	±%
Conservative	G. West*	1,690	38.7	–5.7
Labour	V. Richards	1,264	29.0	+11.2
Liberal Democrats	B. Champion	850	19.5	–13.8
Green	K. Sinclair	560	12.8	+8.4
Majority		426	9.8	–1.2
Turnout		4,364	56.3	+3.2
Registered electors		7,758		
Conservative hold		Swing	▼8.5	

=== Queens Park ===
Queens Park
Party	Candidate	Votes	%	±%
Labour	J. Lythell*	2,018	57.3	–0.2
Conservative	N. Maskell	1,061	30.2	–12.3
Green	M. Simpson	275	7.8	N/A
Liberal Democrats	R. Lewis	165	4.7	N/A
Majority		957	27.2	+12.2
Turnout		3,519	52.0	+2.3
Registered electors		6,770		
Labour hold		Swing	▲6.1	

=== Regency ===
Regency
Party	Candidate	Votes	%	±%
Labour	P. Squires	1,533	47.2	–2.1
Conservative	I. Cockburn	1,056	32.5	–13.3
Green	D. Fitzpatrick	331	10.2	N/A
Independent	J. Wells	171	5.3	N/A
Liberal Democrats	M. Hills	155	4.8	–0.1
Majority		477	14.7	+11.2
Turnout		3,246	44.5	+0.3
Registered electors		7,298		
Labour gain from Conservative		Swing	▲5.6	

=== Rottingdean ===
Rottingdean
Party	Candidate	Votes	%	±%
Conservative	G. Machan	3,029	70.0	–9.3
Labour	P. Gill	616	14.2	+4.3
Green	G. Taylor	346	8.0	N/A
Liberal Democrats	P. Edwards	338	7.8	–3.0
Majority		2,413	55.7	–12.7
Turnout		4,329	55.5	+8.0
Registered electors		7,804		
Conservative hold		Swing	▼6.8	

=== Seven Dials ===
Seven Dials
Party	Candidate	Votes	%	±%
Labour	H. Metcalf	1,673	49.0	+10.8
Conservative	M. Land	882	25.8	–6.1
Liberal Democrats	R. Heale	479	14.0	–15.9
Green	R. Bridger	381	11.2	N/A
Majority		791	23.2	+16.9
Turnout		3,415	46.3	+2.7
Registered electors		7,374		
Labour gain from Liberal Democrats		Swing	▲8.5	

=== St Peters ===
St Peters
Party	Candidate	Votes	%	±%
Labour	C. Simpson*	1,917	52.4	–4.3
Green	I. Brodie	873	23.9	+16.2
Conservative	G. Bush	704	19.3	–11.1
Liberal Democrats	M. Fairweather	162	4.4	–0.8
Majority		1,044	28.6	+2.3
Turnout		3,656	49.1	+6.0
Registered electors		7,442		
Labour hold		Swing	▼10.3	

=== Stanmer ===
Stanmer
Party	Candidate	Votes	%	±%
Labour	T. Framroze*	1,835	54.8	+3.6
Conservative	S. Sweetman	956	28.6	–14.1
Liberal Democrats	J. Lovatt	292	8.7	+2.7
Green	M. Richardson	264	7.9	N/A
Majority		879	26.3	+17.8
Turnout		3,347	46.5	+0.9
Registered electors		7,194		
Labour hold		Swing	▲8.9	

=== Tenantry ===
Tenantry
Party	Candidate	Votes	%	±%
Labour	J. Bassam*	1,902	57.7	+3.5
Conservative	S. Lister	895	27.1	–12.3
Green	E. Parker	312	9.5	N/A
Liberal Democrats	P. Viviann	188	5.7	–0.8
Majority		1,007	30.5	+15.7
Turnout		3,297	44.9	+3.9
Registered electors		7,336		
Labour hold		Swing	▲7.9	

=== Westdene ===
Westdene
Party	Candidate	Votes	%	±%
Conservative	M. Barratt*	1,953	55.3	–15.8
Labour	S. Palmer	849	24.1	+4.3
Green	M. Roberts	414	11.7	N/A
Liberal Democrats	D. Lamb	314	8.9	–0.2
Majority		1,104	31.3	–19.9
Turnout		3,530	49.0	+4.6
Registered electors		7,209		
Conservative hold		Swing	▼10.1	

=== Woodingdean ===
Woodingdean
Party	Candidate	Votes	%	±%
Conservative	B. Grinstead*	1,859	47.5	–18.4
Labour	I. Fyvie	1,456	37.2	+13.1
Liberal Democrats	T. Freeman	310	7.9	–2.1
Green	J. Robinson	286	7.3	N/A
Majority		403	10.3	–31.5
Turnout		3,911	50.7	+7.5
Registered electors		7,711		
Conservative hold		Swing	▼15.8	
