= 1994 Brighton Borough Council election =

1994 UK local government election

← 1992	5 May 1994	1995 →

16 out of 48 seats to Brighton Borough Council 25 seats needed for a majority

	First party	Second party
Party	Labour	Conservative
Last election	25 seats, 32.6%	23 seats, 55.0%
Seats won	12	4
Seats after	26	22
Seat change	▲1	▼1
Popular vote	24,756	16,281
Percentage	49.6%	32.6%
Swing	▲17.0%	▼22.4%
- Winner of each seat at the 1994 Brighton Borough Council election
Council control before election
Labour
Council control after election
Labour

The 1994 Brighton Borough Council election took place on 5 May 1994 to elect members of Brighton Borough Council in East Sussex, England. This was on the same day as other local elections.

== Summary ==
=== Election result ===
1994 Brighton Borough Council election
Party	This election			Full council			This election		
Party	Seats	Net	Seats %	Other	Total	Total %	Votes	Votes %	+/−
Labour	12	▲1	75.0	14	26	54.2	24,756	49.6	+17.0
Conservative	4	▼1	25.0	18	22	45.8	16,281	32.6	–22.4
Liberal Democrats	0	Steady	0.0	0	0	0.0	6,542	13.1	+5.6
Green	0	Steady	0.0	0	0	0.0	2,143	4.3	–0.5
Militant Labour	0	Steady	0.0	0	0	0.0	198	0.4	N/A

== Ward results ==
=== Hanover ===
Hanover
Party	Candidate	Votes	%	±%
Labour	J. Edmond-Smith*	2,133	66.0	+16.6
Conservative	E. Kirby	471	14.6	–22.7
Liberal Democrats	K. McArthur	364	11.3	+4.8
Green	K. Chapman	262	8.1	+1.2
Majority		1,662	51.5	+39.4
Turnout		3,230	40.4	+2.6
Registered electors		8,005		
Labour hold		Swing	▲19.7	

=== Hollingbury ===
Hollingbury
Party	Candidate	Votes	%	±%
Labour	David Lepper	2,028	65.5	+21.3
Conservative	B. Fisher	679	21.9	–24.8
Liberal Democrats	D. Hall	293	9.5	+3.2
Green	B. Coyne	97	3.1	+0.2
Majority		1,349	43.6	N/A
Turnout		3,097	42.7	–0.3
Registered electors		7,262		
Labour hold		Swing	▲23.1	

=== Kings Cliff ===
Kings Cliff
Party	Candidate	Votes	%	±%
Labour	K. Bodfish	1,696	56.4	+17.4
Conservative	G. Wells	872	29.0	–22.0
Liberal Democrats	M. Jones	302	10.0	+4.0
Green	J. Davies	137	4.6	+0.7
Majority		824	27.4	N/A
Turnout		3,007	44.3	+1.3
Registered electors		6,791		
Labour hold		Swing	▲19.7	

=== Marine ===
Marine
Party	Candidate	Votes	%	±%
Labour	D. Turner	1,667	51.0	+19.6
Conservative	S. Kirby	1,069	32.7	–29.4
Liberal Democrats	E. Reed	263	8.0	+3.8
Militant Labour	P. Iveson	198	6.1	N/A
Green	J. Rowden	74	2.3	–0.1
Majority		598	18.3	N/A
Turnout		3,271	42.1	+5.1
Registered electors		7,778		
Labour hold		Swing	▲24.5	

=== Moulescombe ===
Moulescombe
Party	Candidate	Votes	%	±%
Labour	A. Meadows	1,279	60.0	+19.3
Conservative	J. Stevens	526	24.7	–23.9
Liberal Democrats	E. Oldfield	267	12.5	+3.8
Green	M. Ledbury	61	2.9	+0.9
Majority		753	35.3	N/A
Turnout		2,133	31.9	+3.1
Registered electors		6,689		
Labour hold		Swing	▲21.6	

=== Patcham ===
Patcham
Party	Candidate	Votes	%	±%
Conservative	J. Hutchinson*	1,570	47.0	–26.3
Labour	S. Middleton	995	29.8	+11.5
Liberal Democrats	J. De Souza	696	20.8	+14.6
Green	A. Haase	79	2.4	+0.2
Majority		575	17.2	–37.8
Turnout		3,340	48.2	–3.1
Registered electors		6,925		
Conservative hold		Swing	▼18.9	

=== Preston ===
Preston
Party	Candidate	Votes	%	±%
Labour	J. Spray	1,758	53.2	+21.3
Conservative	G. West*	867	26.2	–26.7
Liberal Democrats	T. Hunter	542	16.4	+4.7
Green	L. Littman	137	4.1	+0.6
Majority		891	27.0	N/A
Turnout		3,304	43.2	–5.7
Registered electors		7,653		
Labour gain from Conservative		Swing	▲24.0	

=== Queens Park ===
Queens Park
Party	Candidate	Votes	%	±%
Labour	J. Lythell*	1,747	58.6	+17.9
Conservative	R. Ruzyllo	868	29.1	–22.2
Liberal Democrats	J. Blease	247	8.3	+3.8
Green	M. Santamaria	119	4.0	+0.5
Majority		879	29.5	N/A
Turnout		2,981	47.6	+2.3
Registered electors		6,267		
Labour hold		Swing	▲20.1	

=== Regency ===
Regency
Party	Candidate	Votes	%	±%
Labour	R. Pennington	1,516	51.9	+17.3
Conservative	J. Cameron	867	29.7	–19.9
Liberal Democrats	E. Cotton	373	12.8	+4.1
Green	L. Robinson	166	5.7	–1.4
Majority		649	22.2	N/A
Turnout		2,922	42.2	+1.4
Registered electors		6,924		
Labour hold		Swing	▲18.6	

=== Rottingdean ===
Rottingdean
Party	Candidate	Votes	%	±%
Conservative	S. Wrigley	2,071	61.9	–18.9
Liberal Democrats	P. Edwards	646	19.3	+10.3
Labour	A. Goodchild	548	16.4	+8.0
Green	E. Robinson	83	2.5	+0.7
Majority		1,425	42.6	–29.2
Turnout		3,348	44.3	–2.6
Registered electors		7,552		
Conservative hold		Swing	▼14.6	

=== Seven Dials ===
Seven Dials
Party	Candidate	Votes	%	±%
Labour	L. Austin	1,716	58.3	+19.0
Liberal Democrats	R. Heale	523	17.8	–1.5
Conservative	A. Norman	513	17.4	–16.7
Green	I. Needham	190	6.5	–0.7
Majority		1,193	40.6	+35.4
Turnout		2,942	39.9	±0.0
Registered electors		7,371		
Labour hold		Swing	▲10.3	

=== St Peters ===
St Peters
Party	Candidate	Votes	%	±%
Labour	C. Simpson*	2,043	64.5	+21.2
Conservative	C. Ramsden	466	14.7	–14.5
Liberal Democrats	M. Fairweather	334	10.5	+5.4
Green	J. Berrington	324	10.2	–12.2
Majority		1,577	49.8	+35.7
Turnout		3,167	43.0	+0.4
Registered electors		7,371		
Labour hold		Swing	▲17.9	

=== Stanmer ===
Stanmer
Party	Candidate	Votes	%	±%
Labour	T. Framroze*	1,840	49.4	+15.4
Conservative	D. Careless	1,428	38.3	–19.4
Liberal Democrats	P. Vivian	368	9.9	+4.2
Green	L. Towey	90	2.4	–0.2
Majority		412	11.1	N/A
Turnout		3,726	48.6	+4.1
Registered electors		7,666		
Labour hold		Swing	▲17.4	

=== Tenantry ===
Tenantry
Party	Candidate	Votes	%	±%
Labour	J. Bassam*	1,731	56.8	+19.6
Conservative	D. Dudeney	858	28.1	–24.0
Liberal Democrats	M. Mylton-Thorley	308	10.1	+3.9
Green	S. Mildenhall	152	5.0	+0.5
Majority		873	28.6	N/A
Turnout		3,049	41.4	+2.5
Registered electors		7,374		
Labour hold		Swing	▲21.8	

=== Westdene ===
Westdene
Party	Candidate	Votes	%	±%
Conservative	M. Barratt*	1,567	50.8	–22.2
Labour	S. Prentice	882	28.6	+11.6
Liberal Democrats	D. McBeth	526	17.1	+9.9
Green	P. West	109	3.5	+0.7
Majority		685	22.2	–33.8
Turnout		3,084	43.7	–1.6
Registered electors		7,055		
Conservative hold		Swing	▼16.9	

=== Woodingdean ===
Woodingdean
Party	Candidate	Votes	%	±%
Conservative	B. Grinstead*	1,589	47.9	–19.9
Labour	K. Jago	1,177	35.5	+10.8
Liberal Democrats	J. Dienes	490	14.8	+9.1
Green	M. Adler	63	1.9	+0.1
Majority		412	12.4	–30.7
Turnout		3,319	44.9	–0.9
Registered electors		7,387		
Conservative hold		Swing	▼15.4	
