= 1983 Brighton Borough Council election =

1983 UK local government election

← 1979	5 May 1983	1984 →

All 48 seats to Brighton Borough Council 25 seats needed for a majority

	First party	Second party	Third party
Party	Conservative	Labour	Alliance
Seats won	24	20	4
Seat change	▼12	▲3	▼2
Popular vote	71,121	54,872	34,579
Percentage	44.2%	34.1%	21.5%
- Winner of each seat at the 1983 Brighton Borough Council election
Council control before election
Conservative
Council control after election
No overall control

The 1983 Brighton Borough Council election took place on 5 May 1983 to elect members of Brighton Borough Council in East Sussex, England. This was on the same day as other local elections.

== Summary ==
=== Election result ===
1983 Brighton Borough Council election
Party	Candidates	Seats	Gains	Losses	Net gain/loss	Seats %	Votes %	Votes	+/−
Conservative	48	24	0	10	▼12	50.0	44.2	71,121	
Labour	48	20	10	0	▲3	41.7	34.1	54,872	
Alliance	48	4	1	0	▼2	8.3	21.5	34,579	
National Front	4	0	0	0	Steady	0.0	0.1	208	
Communist	1	0	0	0	Steady	0.0	<0.1	66	
Independent	1	0	0	0	Steady	0.0	<0.1	26	

== Ward results ==
=== Hanover ===
Hanover (3 seats)
Party	Candidate	Votes	%	±%
Alliance	T. Forester	2,260	43.8	
Labour	S. Fitch	2,085	40.4	
Labour	I. Duncan	2,013	39.0	
Alliance	G. Ackers	1,865	36.1	
Alliance	A. Ruewell	1,850	35.8	
Labour	M. Johnson	1,822	35.3	
Conservative	H. Bradley	747	14.5	
Conservative	J. Guy	663	12.8	
Conservative	R. Harrison	652	12.6	
Communist	V. Mundy	66	1.3	
Turnout		5,161	58.4	
Registered electors		8,837		
Alliance gain from Labour				
Labour hold				
Labour hold				

=== Hollingbury ===
Hollingbury (3 seats)
Party	Candidate	Votes	%	±%
Labour	B. Fitch	1,918	49.6	
Labour	D. Lepper	1,798	46.5	
Labour	C. Morley	1,695	43.9	
Conservative	A. Harman	1,440	37.3	
Conservative	J. Miller	1,294	33.5	
Conservative	D. Jakins	1,229	31.8	
Alliance	P. Bailey	507	13.1	
Alliance	D. Hirst	505	13.1	
Alliance	P. Garratt	482	12.5	
Turnout		3,865	50.1	
Registered electors		7,715		
Labour gain from Conservative				
Labour gain from Conservative				
Labour gain from Conservative				

=== Kings Cliff ===
Kings Cliff
Party	Candidate	Votes	%	±%
Conservative	H. Somerville	1,579	49.2	
Conservative	M. Williamson	1,484	46.3	
Conservative	P. Layfield	1,417	44.2	
Labour	F. Tonks	1,344	41.9	
Labour	D. Turner	1,316	41.0	
Labour	A. Winter	1,234	38.5	
Alliance	G. Saunders	281	8.8	
Alliance	T. Measor	277	8.6	
Alliance	B. Purvis	266	8.3	
Turnout		3,207	45.5	
Registered electors		7,049		
Conservative gain from Ind. Conservative				
Conservative hold				
Conservative hold				

=== Marine ===
Marine (3 seats)
Party	Candidate	Votes	%	±%
Conservative	J. Humphrey	1,545	44.0	
Conservative	B. Parish	1,519	43.3	
Conservative	D. Radford	1,507	43.0	
Labour	F. Netley	1,477	42.1	
Labour	G. Haynes	1,339	38.2	
Labour	C. Avey	1,333	38.0	
Alliance	V. Jones	394	11.2	
Alliance	W. McLoughlin	345	9.8	
Alliance	M. Cherrington	339	9.7	
National Front	I. Taylor	66	1.9	
National Front	W. Kennedy	55	1.6	
National Front	M. Wingfield	36	1.0	
Independent	L. Green	26	0.7	
Turnout		3,508	45.0	
Registered electors		7,795		
Conservative win (new seat)				
Conservative win (new seat)				
Conservative win (new seat)				

=== Moulescombe ===
Moulescombe (3 seats)
Party	Candidate	Votes	%	±%
Labour	D. Hobden	1,706	59.8	
Labour	B. Turner	1,479	51.8	
Labour	A. King	1,379	48.3	
Conservative	J. Stevens	858	30.1	
Conservative	A. Holder	829	29.1	
Conservative	K. McKernan	748	26.2	
Alliance	B. Meads	238	8.3	
Alliance	H. Rees	200	7.0	
Alliance	L. Yeodal	191	6.7	
National Front	I. Cameron	51	1.8	
Turnout		2,853	36.5	
Registered electors		7,817		
Labour gain from Conservative				
Labour gain from Conservative				
Labour hold				

=== Patcham ===
Patcham (3 seats)
Party	Candidate	Votes	%	±%
Conservative	L. Solkhon	2,071	61.7	
Conservative	J. Hutchinson	2,022	60.2	
Conservative	J. Wakefield	1,936	57.7	
Labour	W. Scrace	882	26.3	
Labour	M. Lee	869	25.9	
Labour	N. Warren	825	24.6	
Alliance	G. Pendry	402	12.0	
Alliance	H. Butcher	384	11.4	
Alliance	J. Hedger	365	10.9	
Turnout		3,357	46.8	
Registered electors		7,172		
Conservative hold				
Conservative hold				
Conservative hold				

=== Preston ===
Preston (3 seats)
Party	Candidate	Votes	%	±%
Conservative	R. Cristofoll	1,853	55.2	
Conservative	D. Baker	1,830	54.5	
Conservative	J. Leach	1,693	50.4	
Alliance	R. Bates	1,175	35.0	
Alliance	R. Eggleston	1,067	31.8	
Alliance	E. Hack	1,056	31.5	
Labour	G. Haines	885	26.4	
Labour	C. Kenward	857	25.5	
Labour	G. Kent	806	24.0	
Turnout		3,913	48.2	
Registered electors		8,119		
Conservative hold				
Conservative hold				
Conservative hold				

=== Queens Park ===
Queens Park (3 seats)
Party	Candidate	Votes	%	±%
Labour	J. Townsend	1,355	44.7	
Labour	J. Lythell	1,337	44.2	
Labour	R. Stanton	1,320	43.6	
Conservative	M. Byrne	1,259	41.6	
Conservative	F. Forte	1,241	41.0	
Conservative	M. Land	1,230	40.6	
Alliance	B. Saunders	417	13.8	
Alliance	J. Bailey	385	12.7	
Alliance	K. Harwood	358	11.8	
Turnout		3,028	45.8	
Registered electors		6,611		
Labour gain from Conservative				
Labour gain from Conservative				
Labour gain from Conservative				

=== Regency ===
Regency (3 seats)
Party	Candidate	Votes	%	±%
Conservative	P. Nettleton	1,208	42.1	
Conservative	C. Giles	1,175	41.0	
Conservative	A. Feld	1,136	39.6	
Alliance	J. Ungar	1,091	38.1	
Alliance	A. Simpson	973	33.9	
Alliance	B. Bigwood	831	29.0	
Labour	B. Wing	567	19.8	
Labour	L. Rogers	559	19.5	
Labour	J. Woolerton	539	18.8	
Turnout		2,867	39.6	
Registered electors		7,239		
Conservative hold				
Conservative hold				
Conservative hold				

=== Rottingdean ===
Rottingdean (3 seats)
Party	Candidate	Votes	%	±%
Conservative	J. Blackman	3,049	68.7	
Conservative	R. Larkin	2,912	65.6	
Conservative	F. Masefield Baker	2,783	62.7	
Alliance	R. Dore	1,093	24.6	
Alliance	S. Greenway	852	19.2	
Alliance	M. Senior	807	18.2	
Labour	B. Poole	296	6.7	
Labour	A. McKenna	285	6.4	
Labour	B. Wilkinson	255	5.7	
Turnout		4,440	58.0	
Registered electors		7,655		
Conservative hold				
Conservative hold				
Conservative hold				

=== Seven Dials ===
Seven Dials (3 seats)
Party	Candidate	Votes	%	±%
Alliance	D. Rogers	1,543	51.0	
Alliance	F. Hix	1,502	49.6	
Alliance	J. May	1,481	48.9	
Conservative	M. Barratt	932	30.8	
Conservative	A. Stapley	929	30.7	
Conservative	P. Mallard	922	30.5	
Labour	R. Dibley	570	18.8	
Labour	J. Ballance	547	18.1	
Labour	L. Turner	541	17.9	
Turnout		3,026	41.2	
Registered electors		7,344		
Alliance win (new seat)				
Alliance win (new seat)				
Alliance win (new seat)				

=== St Peters ===
St Peters (3 seats)
Party	Candidate	Votes	%	±%
Labour	G. Sweeting	1,436	40.7	
Labour	C. Simpson	1,413	40.1	
Labour	J. Backwell	1,361	38.6	
Conservative	B. Farmer	1,093	31.0	
Conservative	L. Watts	1,051	29.8	
Conservative	A. Robinson	1,049	29.8	
Alliance	M. Neves	994	28.2	
Alliance	B. Neves	912	25.9	
Alliance	K. Butcher	837	23.7	
Turnout		3,525	48.0	
Registered electors		7,344		
Labour gain from Conservative				
Labour gain from Conservative				
Labour gain from Conservative				

=== Stanmer ===
Stanmer (3 seats)
Party	Candidate	Votes	%	±%
Labour	P. Hawkes	1,595	50.4	
Labour	G. Humphrey	1,557	49.2	
Labour	R. Blackwood	1,551	49.0	
Conservative	A. Cartwright	1,219	38.5	
Conservative	N. Biggon	1,184	37.4	
Conservative	G. West	1,128	35.7	
Alliance	C. Gammon	346	10.9	
Alliance	D. McBeth	337	10.7	
Alliance	D. Simpson	310	9.8	
Turnout		3,163	40.6	
Registered electors		7,790		
Labour hold				
Labour hold				
Labour hold				

=== Tenantry ===
Tenantry (3 seats)
Party	Candidate	Votes	%	±%
Labour	N. Clarke	1,598	47.6	
Labour	S. Bassam	1,566	46.7	
Labour	B. Davies	1,470	43.8	
Conservative	M. Toner	1,229	36.6	
Conservative	E. Jakes	1,228	36.6	
Conservative	P. Robinson	1,227	36.6	
Alliance	J. Barnes	526	15.7	
Alliance	B. Greenway	426	12.7	
Alliance	J. Driscoll	421	12.6	
Turnout		3,354	43.0	
Registered electors		7,799		
Labour win (new seat)				
Labour win (new seat)				
Labour win (new seat)				

=== Westdene ===
Westdene (3 seats)
Party	Candidate	Votes	%	±%
Conservative	A. Clark	2,128	64.0	
Conservative	G. Theobald	2,089	62.9	
Conservative	C. Jermy	2,046	61.6	
Alliance	D. Roberts	701	21.1	
Alliance	L. How	664	20.0	
Alliance	A. Ungar	658	19.8	
Labour	F. Spicer	492	14.8	
Labour	M. Marsh	478	14.4	
Labour	P. Philo	472	14.2	
Turnout		3,323	44.2	
Registered electors		7,519		
Conservative win (new seat)				
Conservative win (new seat)				
Conservative win (new seat)				

=== Woodingdean ===
Woodingdean (3 seats)
Party	Candidate	Votes	%	±%
Conservative	D. Smith	2,321	60.4	
Conservative	B. Grinsted	2,246	58.5	
Conservative	A. Hill	2,191	57.0	
Labour	L. Williams	895	23.3	
Labour	H. Dunford	890	23.2	
Labour	P. Holmes	865	22.5	
Alliance	H. Farrow	623	16.2	
Alliance	K. Hale	525	13.7	
Alliance	D. Stokes	517	13.5	
Turnout		3,842	48.0	
Registered electors		8,005		
Conservative win (new seat)				
Conservative win (new seat)				
Conservative win (new seat)				
