= 1992 Brighton Borough Council election =

1992 UK local government election

← 1991	7 May 1992	1994 →

16 out of 48 seats to Brighton Borough Council 25 seats needed for a majority

	First party	Second party
Party	Labour	Conservative
Last election	33 seats, 39.9%	15 seats, 40.0%
Seats won	3	13
Seats after	25	23
Seat change	▼8	▲8
Popular vote	16,138	27,241
Percentage	32.6%	55.0%
Swing	▼7.3%	▲15.0%
- Winner of each seat at the 1992 Brighton Borough Council election
Council control before election
Labour
Council control after election
Labour

The 1992 Brighton Borough Council election took place on 7 May 1992 to elect members of Brighton Borough Council in East Sussex, England. This was on the same day as other local elections.

== Summary ==
=== Election result ===
1992 Brighton Borough Council election
Party	This election			Full council			This election		
Party	Seats	Net	Seats %	Other	Total	Total %	Votes	Votes %	+/−
Labour	3	▼8	18.8	22	25	52.1	16,138	32.6	–7.3
Conservative	13	▲8	81.3	10	23	47.9	27,241	55.0	+15.0
Liberal Democrats	0	Steady	0.0	0	0	0.0	3,734	7.5	–4.8
Green	0	Steady	0.0	0	0	0.0	2,372	4.8	–2.5

== Ward results ==
=== Hanover ===
Hanover
Party	Candidate	Votes	%	±%
Labour	I. Duncan*	1,507	49.4	–5.7
Conservative	P. Jolly	1,137	37.3	+18.8
Green	S. Mildenhall	209	6.9	–2.8
Liberal Democrats	K. McArthur	197	6.5	–3.4
Majority		370	12.1	–24.5
Turnout		3,050	37.8	–3.7
Registered electors		8,063		
Labour hold		Swing	▼12.3	

=== Hollingbury ===
Hollingbury
Party	Candidate	Votes	%	±%
Conservative	S. Lister	1,486	46.7	+20.6
Labour	M. Julian	1,407	44.2	–11.7
Liberal Democrats	D. Lamb	201	6.3	–6.3
Green	P. Tosts	91	2.9	–2.6
Majority		79	2.5	N/A
Turnout		3,185	43.0	+0.5
Registered electors		7,343		
Conservative gain from Labour		Swing	▲16.2	

=== Kings Cliff ===
Kings Cliff
Party	Candidate	Votes	%	±%
Conservative	B. Dempsey	1,492	51.0	+8.7
Labour	A. King	1,142	39.0	–4.3
Liberal Democrats	M. Jones	177	6.0	–2.9
Green	P. Hodd	115	3.9	–1.6
Majority		350	12.0	N/A
Turnout		2,926	43.0	–3.9
Registered electors		6,793		
Conservative gain from Labour		Swing	▲6.5	

=== Marine ===
Marine
Party	Candidate	Votes	%	±%
Conservative	M. Mears	1,790	62.1	+20.2
Labour	H. Miller	904	31.4	–19.3
Liberal Democrats	E. Reed	120	4.2	+0.1
Green	M. Simpson	68	2.4	–0.8
Majority		886	30.7	N/A
Turnout		2,882	37.0	–2.8
Registered electors		7,650		
Conservative gain from Labour		Swing	▲19.8	

=== Moulescombe ===
Moulescombe
Party	Candidate	Votes	%	±%
Conservative	K. Gunn	970	48.6	+23.6
Labour	C. Adams	813	40.7	–17.9
Liberal Democrats	M. Allen	174	8.7	–3.0
Green	M. Howard	39	2.0	–2.7
Majority		157	7.9	N/A
Turnout		1,996	28.8	–5.9
Registered electors		6,932		
Conservative gain from Labour		Swing	▲20.8	

=== Patcham ===
Patcham
Party	Candidate	Votes	%	±%
Conservative	C. Theobald	2,631	73.3	+18.3
Labour	J. Hazelgrove	656	18.3	–8.4
Liberal Democrats	D. Powell	223	6.2	–7.0
Green	L. Littman	79	2.2	–3.0
Majority		1,975	55.0	+26.7
Turnout		3,589	51.3	+1.1
Registered electors		6,994		
Conservative hold		Swing	▲13.4	

=== Preston ===
Preston
Party	Candidate	Votes	%	±%
Conservative	V. Marchant	2,000	52.9	+9.7
Labour	T. Glading	1,205	31.9	–0.3
Liberal Democrats	G. Hawthorn	443	11.7	–6.6
Green	B. Madadi	134	3.5	–2.8
Majority		795	21.0	+10.0
Turnout		3,782	48.9	–1.9
Registered electors		7,732		
Conservative hold		Swing	▲5.0	

=== Queens Park ===
Queens Park
Party	Candidate	Votes	%	±%
Conservative	N. Maskell	1,479	51.3	+20.6
Labour	M. Morris	1,174	40.7	–13.0
Liberal Democrats	J. Blease	130	4.5	–4.8
Green	J. Hodd	102	3.5	–2.8
Majority		305	10.6	N/A
Turnout		2,885	45.3	+0.9
Registered electors		6,364		
Conservative gain from Labour		Swing	▲16.8	

=== Regency ===
Regency
Party	Candidate	Votes	%	±%
Conservative	M. Boggon	1,395	49.6	+10.3
Labour	R. Pennington	972	34.6	–6.2
Liberal Democrats	P. Jagdis	244	8.7	–5.1
Green	K. Chapman	199	7.1	+1.0
Majority		423	15.1	N/A
Turnout		2,810	40.8	+1.0
Registered electors		6,881		
Conservative gain from Labour		Swing	▲8.3	

=== Rottingdean ===
Rottingdean
Party	Candidate	Votes	%	±%
Conservative	N. Wright	2,894	80.8	+6.4
Liberal Democrats	P. Edwards	322	9.0	–3.2
Labour	J. Moriarty	302	8.4	–2.9
Green	L. Robinson	65	1.8	–0.2
Majority		2,572	71.8	+9.6
Turnout		3,583	46.9	–4.2
Registered electors		7,638		
Conservative hold		Swing	▲4.8	

=== Seven Dials ===
Seven Dials
Party	Candidate	Votes	%	±%
Labour	M. Middleton	1,124	39.3	–1.1
Conservative	R. Larkin	976	34.1	+9.7
Liberal Democrats	R. Heale	552	19.3	+1.3
Green	I. Needham	207	7.2	–10.0
Majority		148	5.2	–10.8
Turnout		2,859	39.9	–4.4
Registered electors		7,160		
Labour hold		Swing	▼5.4	

=== St Peters ===
St Peters
Party	Candidate	Votes	%	±%
Labour	G. Sweeting*	1,344	43.3	–2.7
Conservative	M. Gillott	907	29.2	+8.4
Green	E. Rowlands	696	22.4	–2.6
Liberal Democrats	W. Parker	160	5.1	–3.2
Majority		437	14.1	–6.9
Turnout		3,107	42.6	–0.8
Registered electors		7,287		
Labour hold		Swing	▼5.6	

=== Stanmer ===
Stanmer
Party	Candidate	Votes	%	±%
Conservative	S. Sweetman	1,943	57.7	+21.3
Labour	R. Blackwood	1,145	34.0	–9.1
Liberal Democrats	P. Vivian	192	5.7	–6.3
Green	M. Ledbury	88	2.6	–6.0
Majority		798	23.7	N/A
Turnout		3,368	44.5	+2.3
Registered electors		7,575		
Conservative gain from Labour		Swing	▲15.2	

=== Tenantry ===
Tenantry
Party	Candidate	Votes	%	±%
Conservative	M. Toner	1,461	52.1	+19.1
Labour	K. Bodfish	1,045	37.2	–12.8
Liberal Democrats	B. Stocker	173	6.2	–5.4
Green	J. Berrington	127	4.5	–0.9
Majority		416	14.8	N/A
Turnout		2,806	38.9	+0.2
Registered electors		7,222		
Conservative gain from Labour		Swing	▲16.0	

=== Westdene ===
Westdene
Party	Candidate	Votes	%	±%
Conservative	J. Humphrey*	2,342	73.0	+13.7
Labour	F. Spicer	545	17.0	–4.3
Liberal Democrats	D. McBeth	231	7.2	–7.2
Green	J. Mack	90	2.8	–2.2
Majority		1,797	56.0	+17.9
Turnout		3,208	45.3	–0.3
Registered electors		7,082		
Conservative hold		Swing	▲9.0	

=== Woodingdean ===
Woodingdean
Party	Candidate	Votes	%	±%
Conservative	P. Stiles	2,338	67.8	+14.6
Labour	G. Mitchell	853	24.7	–3.9
Liberal Democrats	M. Hills	195	5.7	–9.8
Green	K. Billington	63	1.8	–0.9
Majority		1,485	43.1	+18.4
Turnout		3,449	45.8	–2.5
Registered electors		7,537		
Conservative hold		Swing	▲9.3	
