= 1991 Brighton Borough Council election =

1991 UK local government election

← 1990	3 May 1991	1992 →

16 out of 48 seats to Brighton Borough Council 25 seats needed for a majority

	First party	Second party
Party	Labour	Conservative
Last election	29 seats, 45.9%	18 seats, 35.3%
Seats won	11	5
Seats after	33	15
Seat change	▲4	▼3
Popular vote	20,399	20,477
Percentage	39.9%	40.0%
Swing	▼6.0%	▲4.7%
- Winner of each seat at the 1991 Brighton Borough Council election
Council control before election
Labour
Council control after election
Labour

The 1991 Brighton Borough Council election took place on 2 May 1991 to elect members of Brighton Borough Council in East Sussex, England. This was on the same day as other local elections.

== Summary ==
=== Election result ===
1991 Brighton Borough Council election
Party	This election			Full council			This election		
Party	Seats	Net	Seats %	Other	Total	Total %	Votes	Votes %	+/−
Labour	11	▲4	68.8	22	33	68.8	20,399	39.9	–6.0
Conservative	5	▼3	31.3	10	15	31.3	20,477	40.0	+4.7
Liberal Democrats	0	▼1	0.0	0	0	0.0	6,286	12.3	+3.9
Green	0	Steady	0.0	0	0	0.0	3,749	7.3	–2.9
Independent	0	Steady	0.0	0	0	0.0	227	0.4	+0.1

== Ward results ==
=== Hanover ===
Hanover
Party	Candidate	Votes	%	±%
Labour	S. Schaffer*	1,828	55.1	–9.8
Conservative	N. Fissler	614	18.5	+1.7
Liberal Democrats	K. McArthur	329	9.9	+4.2
Green	J. Hood	321	9.7	–2.9
Independent	J. Komitzer	227	6.8	N/A
Majority		1,214	36.6	–11.6
Turnout		3,319	41.5	–3.4
Registered electors		8,000		
Labour hold		Swing	▼5.8	

=== Hollingbury ===
Hollingbury
Party	Candidate	Votes	%	±%
Labour	B. Fitch*	1,763	55.9	–5.0
Conservative	C. Sweetman	823	26.1	+4.9
Liberal Democrats	D. Lamb	396	12.6	+3.3
Green	M. Dadson	172	5.5	–3.2
Majority		940	29.8	–9.9
Turnout		3,154	42.5	–5.4
Registered electors		7,426		
Labour hold		Swing	▼5.0	

=== Kings Cliff ===
Kings Cliff
Party	Candidate	Votes	%	±%
Labour	J. Christy	1,356	43.3	–4.1
Conservative	V. Marchant	1,323	42.3	+4.8
Liberal Democrats	M. Jones	278	8.9	+1.1
Green	P. Hood	173	5.5	–1.8
Majority		33	1.1	–8.8
Turnout		3,130	46.9	–4.8
Registered electors		6,673		
Labour gain from Conservative		Swing	▼4.5	

=== Marine ===
Marine
Party	Candidate	Votes	%	±%
Labour	J. Hunter	1,529	50.7	–5.6
Conservative	M. Mears	1,264	41.9	+10.0
Liberal Democrats	E. Reed	125	4.1	–1.3
Green	S. Watson	97	3.2	–3.2
Majority		265	8.8	–15.6
Turnout		3,130	39.8	–5.6
Registered electors		7,584		
Labour gain from Conservative		Swing	▼7.8	

=== Moulescombe ===
Moulescombe
Party	Candidate	Votes	%	±%
Labour	F. Tonks	1,409	58.6	–9.8
Conservative	K. Gunn	601	25.0	+7.8
Liberal Democrats	J. Lovatt	281	11.7	+4.4
Green	N. McMaster	112	4.7	–2.4
Majority		808	33.6	–17.6
Turnout		2,403	34.7	–6.9
Registered electors		6,925		
Labour hold		Swing	▼8.8	

=== Patcham ===
Patcham
Party	Candidate	Votes	%	±%
Conservative	B. Solkhon*	1,916	55.0	+4.0
Labour	T. Glading	931	26.7	–4.0
Liberal Democrats	S. Buckingham	459	13.2	+3.9
Green	L. Littman	180	5.2	–3.7
Majority		985	28.3	+8.0
Turnout		3,486	50.2	–3.5
Registered electors		6,949		
Conservative hold		Swing	▲4.0	

=== Preston ===
Preston
Party	Candidate	Votes	%	±%
Conservative	D. Radford	1,705	43.2	+4.5
Labour	C. Kemp	1,272	32.2	+3.2
Liberal Democrats	D. Rudling	721	18.3	–1.2
Green	M. Howard	247	6.3	–6.5
Majority		433	11.0	+1.2
Turnout		3,945	50.8	–5.5
Registered electors		7,763		
Conservative hold		Swing	▲0.7	

=== Queens Park ===
Queens Park
Party	Candidate	Votes	%	±%
Labour	J. Townsend*	1,542	53.7	–3.6
Conservative	M. Land	880	30.7	+0.5
Liberal Democrats	R. Lewis	267	9.3	+4.6
Green	M. Simpson	181	6.3	–1.5
Majority		662	23.1	–4.1
Turnout		2,870	44.4	–7.6
Registered electors		6,468		
Labour hold		Swing	▼2.1	

=== Regency ===
Regency
Party	Candidate	Votes	%	±%
Labour	N. Ping	1,153	40.8	–6.4
Conservative	I. Cockburn	1,110	39.3	+6.8
Liberal Democrats	T. Freeman	390	13.8	+9.0
Green	R. Glick	173	6.1	–4.1
Majority		43	1.5	–13.2
Turnout		2,826	39.8	–4.7
Registered electors		7,109		
Labour gain from Conservative		Swing	▼6.6	

=== Rottingdean ===
Rottingdean
Party	Candidate	Votes	%	±%
Conservative	J. Blackman*	2,929	74.4	+4.4
Liberal Democrats	P. Edwards	482	12.2	+4.4
Labour	P. Gill	446	11.3	–2.9
Green	R. Bridger	80	2.0	–6.0
Majority		2,447	62.2	+6.5
Turnout		3,937	51.1	–4.4
Registered electors		7,697		
Conservative hold		Swing	0.0	

=== Seven Dials ===
Seven Dials
Party	Candidate	Votes	%	±%
Labour	N. Robinson	1,304	40.4	–8.6
Conservative	R. Larkin	789	24.4	–1.4
Liberal Democrats	R. Heale	580	18.0	+4.0
Green	I. Brodie	554	17.2	+6.0
Majority		515	16.0	–7.2
Turnout		3,227	44.3	–2.0
Registered electors		7,283		
Labour gain from Liberal Democrats		Swing	▼3.6	

=== St Peters ===
St Peters
Party	Candidate	Votes	%	±%
Labour	L. Gwyn-Jones	1,469	46.0	–6.4
Green	E. Rowlands	798	25.0	+1.1
Conservative	D. Cullen	665	20.8	+1.5
Liberal Democrats	M. Fairweather	264	8.3	+3.9
Majority		671	21.0	–7.6
Turnout		3,196	43.4	–5.7
Registered electors		7,357		
Labour hold		Swing	▼3.8	

=== Stanmer ===
Stanmer
Party	Candidate	Votes	%	±%
Labour	P. Hawkes*	1,277	43.1	–11.7
Conservative	S. Sweetman	1,078	36.4	+7.8
Liberal Democrats	P. Vivian	356	12.0	+3.3
Green	M. Ledbury	254	8.6	+0.7
Majority		199	6.7	–19.6
Turnout		2,965	42.2	–4.3
Registered electors		7,024		
Labour hold		Swing	▼9.8	

=== Tenantry ===
Tenantry
Party	Candidate	Votes	%	±%
Labour	A. Durr	1,389	50.0	–7.7
Conservative	S. Lister	917	33.0	+5.9
Liberal Democrats	M. Hills	323	11.6	+5.9
Green	M. Richardson	149	5.4	–4.1
Majority		472	17.0	–13.5
Turnout		2,965	38.7	–6.2
Registered electors		7,180		
Labour hold		Swing	▼6.8	

=== Westdene ===
Westdene
Party	Candidate	Votes	%	±%
Conservative	H. Drake*	1,917	59.3	+4.0
Labour	F. Spicer	687	21.3	–2.8
Liberal Democrats	P. Jagdis	467	14.4	+5.5
Green	M. Roberts	161	5.0	–6.7
Majority		1,230	38.1	+6.8
Turnout		3,232	45.6	–3.4
Registered electors		7,092		
Conservative hold		Swing	▲3.4	

=== Woodingdean ===
Woodingdean
Party	Candidate	Votes	%	±%
Conservative	D. Smith*	1,946	53.2	+5.7
Labour	I. Fyvie	1,044	28.6	–8.6
Liberal Democrats	G. Hawthorne	568	15.5	+7.6
Green	H. Robinson	97	2.7	–4.6
Majority		902	24.7	+14.4
Turnout		3,655	48.3	–2.4
Registered electors		7,568		
Conservative hold		Swing	▲7.2	
