= 1984 Brighton Borough Council election =

1984 UK local government election

← 1983	3 May 1984	1986 →

16 out of 48 seats to Brighton Borough Council 25 seats needed for a majority

	First party	Second party	Third party
Party	Conservative	Labour	Alliance
Last election	24 seats, 44.4%	20 seats, 34.1%	4 seats, 22.5%
Seats won	7	8	1
Seats after	23	21	4
Seat change	▼1	▲1	Steady
Popular vote	22,019	20,372	9,273
Percentage	42.3%	39.2%	17.8%
Swing	▼1.9%	▲5.1%	▼3.7%
- Winner of each seat at the 1984 Brighton Borough Council election
Council control before election
No overall control
Council control after election
No overall control

The 1984 Brighton Borough Council election took place on 3 May 1984 to elect members of Brighton Borough Council in East Sussex, England. This was on the same day as other local elections.

== Summary ==
=== Election result ===
1984 Brighton Borough Council election
Party	This election			Full council			This election		
Party	Seats	Net	Seats %	Other	Total	Total %	Votes	Votes %	+/−
Conservative	7	▼1	43.8	16	23	47.9	22,019	42.3	–1.9
Labour	8	▲1	50.0	13	21	43.8	20,372	39.2	+5.1
Alliance	1	Steady	6.3	3	4	8.3	9,273	17.8	–3.7
Ecology	0	Steady	0.0	0	0	0.0	308	0.6	N/A
National Front	0	Steady	0.0	0	0	0.0	38	0.1	±0.0

== Ward results ==
=== Hanover ===
Hanover
Party	Candidate	Votes	%	±%
Labour	I. Duncan*	1,922	43.4	+3.0
Alliance	G. Ackers	1,815	41.0	–2.8
Conservative	B. Bradley	578	13.1	–1.4
Ecology	D. Aherne	112	2.5	N/A
Majority		107	2.4	N/A
Turnout		4,427	50.3	–8.1
Registered electors		8,795		
Labour hold		Swing	▲2.9	

=== Hollingbury ===
Hollingbury
Party	Candidate	Votes	%	±%
Labour	C. Morley*	1,934	56.0	+6.4
Conservative	M. Barratt	1,220	35.3	–2.0
Alliance	T. Hunter	299	8.7	–4.4
Majority		714	20.7	N/A
Turnout		3,453	44.4	–5.7
Registered electors		7,770		
Labour hold		Swing	▲4.2	

=== Kings Cliff ===
Kings Cliff
Party	Candidate	Votes	%	±%
Labour	G. Haynes	1,621	49.6	+7.7
Conservative	P. Layfield*	1,447	44.3	–5.0
Alliance	C. Gray	198	6.1	–2.7
Majority		174	5.3	N/A
Turnout		3,266	47.3	+1.8
Registered electors		6,902		
Labour gain from Conservative		Swing	▲6.4	

=== Marine ===
Marine
Party	Candidate	Votes	%	±%
Conservative	D. Radford*	1,471	46.0	+2.0
Labour	C. Avey	1,463	45.7	+3.6
Alliance	V. Jones	227	7.1	–4.1
National Front	W. Kennedy	38	1.2	–0.7
Majority		8	0.3	N/A
Turnout		3,199	40.9	–4.1
Registered electors		7,813		
Conservative hold		Swing	▼0.8	

=== Moulescombe ===
Moulescombe
Party	Candidate	Votes	%	±%
Labour	A. King*	1,375	58.7	–1.1
Conservative	J. Stevens	758	32.4	+2.3
Alliance	B. Meads	209	8.9	+0.6
Majority		617	26.3	N/A
Turnout		2,342	30.3	–6.2
Registered electors		7,740		
Labour hold		Swing	▼1.7	

=== Patcham ===
Patcham
Party	Candidate	Votes	%	±%
Conservative	J. Wakefield*	1,745	56.3	–5.4
Labour	J. Scrace	818	26.4	+0.1
Alliance	M. Birch	534	17.2	+5.2
Majority		927	29.9	N/A
Turnout		3,097	43.2	–3.6
Registered electors		7,165		
Conservative hold		Swing	▼2.8	

=== Preston ===
Preston
Party	Candidate	Votes	%	±%
Conservative	J. Leach*	1,642	44.9	–2.5
Alliance	R. Eggleston	1,159	31.7	+1.7
Labour	C. Kedward	798	21.8	–0.8
Ecology	W. Fuller	60	1.6	N/A
Majority		483	13.2	N/A
Turnout		3,659	45.3	–2.9
Registered electors		8,083		
Conservative hold		Swing	▼2.1	

=== Queens Park ===
Queens Park
Party	Candidate	Votes	%	±%
Labour	R. Stanton*	1,816	56.9	+12.2
Conservative	M. Byrne	1,377	43.1	+1.6
Majority		439	13.7	N/A
Turnout		3,193	48.4	+2.6
Registered electors		6,593		
Labour hold		Swing	▲5.3	

=== Regency ===
Regency
Party	Candidate	Votes	%	±%
Conservative	A. Feld*	1,021	34.8	–7.3
Labour	A. Winter	961	32.7	+12.9
Alliance	J. Ungar	895	30.5	–7.6
Ecology	M. Dixon	58	2.0	N/A
Majority		60	2.0	N/A
Turnout		2,935	40.8	+1.2
Registered electors		7,186		
Conservative hold		Swing	▼10.1	

=== Rottingdean ===
Rottingdean
Party	Candidate	Votes	%	±%
Conservative	F. Masefield Baker*	2,588	76.9	+8.2
Alliance	K. Harwood	433	12.9	–11.7
Labour	B. Wing	343	10.2	+3.5
Majority		2,155	64.1	+6.1
Turnout		3,364	43.5	–14.5
Registered electors		7,732		
Conservative hold		Swing	▲10.0	

=== Seven Dials ===
Seven Dials
Party	Candidate	Votes	%	±%
Alliance	J. May*	1,180	40.4	–10.3
Conservative	P. Mallard	962	32.9	+2.3
Labour	B. Dibley	779	26.7	+8.0
Majority		218	7.5	N/A
Turnout		2,921	39.8	–1.4
Registered electors		7,337		
Alliance hold		Swing	▼6.3	

=== St Peters ===
St Peters
Party	Candidate	Votes	%	±%
Labour	J. Backwell*	1,487	44.6	+3.8
Alliance	M. Neves	895	26.8	–1.4
Conservative	L. Watts	875	26.2	–4.8
Ecology	K. Simmons	78	2.3	N/A
Majority		592	17.8	N/A
Turnout		3,335	45.5	–2.5
Registered electors		7,325		
Labour hold		Swing	▲2.6	

=== Stanmer ===
Stanmer
Party	Candidate	Votes	%	±%
Labour	R. Blackwood*	1,710	54.5	+4.0
Conservative	G. West	1,182	37.7	–0.9
Alliance	A. Cole	243	7.8	–3.1
Majority		528	16.8	N/A
Turnout		3,135	40.0	–0.6
Registered electors		7,842		
Labour hold		Swing	▲2.5	

=== Tenantry ===
Tenantry
Party	Candidate	Votes	%	±%
Labour	B. Davies*	1,750	53.8	+6.1
Conservative	M. Toner	1,202	37.0	+0.3
Alliance	M. Gare-Simmons	300	9.2	–6.5
Majority		548	16.9	N/A
Turnout		3,252	41.8	–1.2
Registered electors		7,788		
Labour hold		Swing	▲2.9	

=== Westdene ===
Westdene
Party	Candidate	Votes	%	±%
Conservative	C. Jermy*	1,882	61.7	–2.4
Alliance	D. Roberts	614	20.1	–1.0
Labour	B. Williams	555	18.2	+3.4
Majority		1,268	41.6	N/A
Turnout		3,051	40.8	–3.4
Registered electors		7,483		
Conservative hold		Swing	▼0.7	

=== Woodingdean ===
Woodingdean
Party	Candidate	Votes	%	±%
Conservative	A. Hill*	2,069	61.2	+0.7
Labour	B. Hinchliff	1,040	30.8	+7.5
Alliance	R. Dore	272	8.0	–8.2
Majority		1,029	30.4	N/A
Turnout		3,381	42.0	–6.0
Registered electors		8,044		
Conservative hold		Swing	▼3.4	
