= 1987 Brighton Borough Council election =

1987 UK local government election

- 7 May 1987

17 out of 48 seats to Brighton Borough Council 25 seats needed for a majority

	First party	Second party	Third party
Party	Labour	Conservative	Alliance
Last election	23 seats, 40.5%	21 seats, 39.1%	4 seats, 19.8%
Seats won	8	8	1
Seats after	24	21	3
Seat change	▲1	Steady	▼1
Popular vote	21,629	29,938	11,617
Percentage	33.8%	46.8%	18.2%
Swing	▼6.7%	▲7.7%	▼1.6%
- Winner of each seat at the 1987 Brighton Borough Council election
Council control before election
No overall control
Council control after election
No overall control

The 1987 Brighton Borough Council election took place on 7 May 1987 to elect members of Brighton Borough Council in East Sussex, England. This was on the same day as other local elections.

== Summary ==
=== Election result ===
1987 Brighton Borough Council election
Party	This election			Full council			This election		
Party	Seats	Net	Seats %	Other	Total	Total %	Votes	Votes %	+/−
Labour	8	▲1	47.1	16	24	50.0	21,629	33.8	–6.7
Conservative	8	Steady	47.1	13	21	43.8	29,938	46.8	+7.7
Alliance	1	▼1	5.9	2	3	6.3	11,617	18.2	–1.6
Green	0	Steady	0.0	0	0	0.0	739	1.2	+0.7

== Ward results ==
=== Hanover ===
Hanover
Party	Candidate	Votes	%	±%
Labour	S. Schaffer	1,989	51.3	–9.1
Conservative	P. Holden	1,211	31.2	+9.3
Alliance	A. Harris	523	13.5	–3.2
Green	G. Mills	154	4.0	N/A
Majority		778	20.1	–18.4
Turnout		3,877	45.1	+0.7
Registered electors		8,592		
Labour gain from Alliance		Swing	▼9.2	

=== Hollingbury ===
Hollingbury
Party	Candidate	Votes	%	±%
Labour	B. Fitch*	1,739	46.3	–11.7
Conservative	M. Gray	1,508	40.2	+15.3
Alliance	D. McBeth	430	11.5	–5.6
Green	H. Busby	78	2.1	N/A
Majority		231	6.2	–34.9
Turnout		3,755	48.6	+15.5
Registered electors		7,720		
Labour hold		Swing	▼13.5	

=== Kings Cliff ===
Kings Cliff
Party	Candidate	Votes	%	±%
Conservative	M. Furminger	1,673	45.0	+5.2
Labour	J. Christy	1,660	44.6	–5.4
Alliance	M. Dennis	388	10.4	+0.2
Majority		13	0.3	N/A
Turnout		3,721	54.5	+1.5
Registered electors		6,828		
Conservative hold		Swing	▲5.3	

=== Marine ===
Marine
Party	Candidate	Votes	%	±%
Conservative	M. Maine	1,974	48.9	+8.5
Labour	H. Walker	1,730	42.9	–7.4
Alliance	V. Wares	330	8.2	–1.2
Majority		244	6.0	N/A
Turnout		4,034	51.4	+4.0
Registered electors		7,844		
Conservative hold		Swing	▲8.0	

=== Moulescombe ===
Moulescombe
Party	Candidate	Votes	%	±%
Labour	D. Hobden*	1,263	46.3	–14.8
Conservative	J. Stevens	934	34.3	+13.0
Alliance	K. Grayson	529	19.4	+1.8
Majority		329	12.1	–27.6
Turnout		2,726	36.6	+4.2
Registered electors		7,452		
Labour hold		Swing	▼13.9	

=== Patcham ===
Patcham
Party	Candidate	Votes	%	±%
Conservative	L. Solkhon*	2,620	63.3	+8.4
Labour	D. Betts	775	18.7	–7.7
Alliance	N. Cook	659	15.9	–2.8
Green	H. Jones	82	2.0	N/A
Majority		1,845	44.6	+16.1
Turnout		4,136	57.3	+4.7
Registered electors		7,216		
Conservative hold		Swing	▲8.1	

=== Preston ===
Preston
Party	Candidate	Votes	%	±%
Conservative	R. Cristofoll*	2,194	45.9	+3.7
Alliance	B. Champion	1,837	38.4	+1.9
Labour	H. Stallybrass	754	15.8	–5.5
Majority		357	7.5	+1.9
Turnout		4,785	59.6	+3.8
Registered electors		8,024		
Conservative hold		Swing	▲0.9	

=== Queens Park ===
Queens Park
Party	Candidate	Votes	%	±%
Labour	J. Townsend*	1,645	48.7	–3.7
Conservative	M. Land	1,384	40.9	+3.4
Alliance	L. Harris	352	10.4	+0.4
Majority		261	7.7	–7.2
Turnout		3,381	51.9	–0.8
Registered electors		6,509		
Labour hold		Swing	▼3.6	

=== Regency ===
Regency
Party	Candidate	Votes	%	±%
Conservative	E. Preece-Smith	1,566	45.7	+1.3
Labour	A. Winter	1,409	41.1	+0.1
Alliance	R. Heale	455	13.3	–1.4
Majority		157	4.6	+1.2
Turnout		3,430	49.8	+4.7
Registered electors		6,893		
Conservative hold		Swing	▲0.6	

=== Rottingdean ===
Rottingdean
Party	Candidate	Votes	%	±%
Conservative	J. Blackman*	3,435	76.1	+9.7
Alliance	K. Harwood	806	17.8	–7.1
Labour	K. Thomson	275	6.1	–2.6
Majority		2,629	58.2	+16.7
Turnout		4,516	56.7	+4.6
Registered electors		7,969		
Conservative hold		Swing	▲8.4	

=== Seven Dials ===
Seven Dials
Party	Candidate	Votes	%	±%
Alliance	D. Rogers*	1,367	38.6	+0.8
Conservative	T. Williamson	1,132	32.0	+6.1
Labour	F. Tonks	1,041	29.4	–2.3
Majority		235	6.6	+0.5
Turnout		3,540	49.7	+1.1
Registered electors		7,126		
Alliance hold		Swing	▼2.7	

=== St Peters ===
St Peters (2 seats due to by-election)
Party	Candidate	Votes	%
Labour	J. Calder	1,565	43.8
Labour	G. Sweeting*	1,471	41.2
Conservative	T. Beale	1,228	34.4
Conservative	A. Risbridger	1,147	32.1
Alliance	L. Ashworthy	520	14.6
Alliance	M. Rutherford	511	14.3
Green	I. Brodie	256	7.2
Turnout		3,573	48.7
Registered electors		7,336	
Labour hold			
Labour hold			

=== Stanmer ===
Stanmer
Party	Candidate	Votes	%	±%
Labour	P. Hawkes*	1,509	42.5	–10.4
Conservative	D. Fairhall	1,422	40.1	+9.5
Alliance	R. Spencer	616	17.4	+0.9
Majority		87	2.5	–19.8
Turnout		3,547	46.9	+6.1
Registered electors		7,557		
Labour hold		Swing	▼10.0	

=== Tenantry ===
Tenantry
Party	Candidate	Votes	%	±%
Labour	K. Packham	1,500	44.4	–14.1
Conservative	P. Farthing	1,341	39.7	+12.6
Alliance	J. Whittingham	540	16.0	+1.6
Majority		159	4.7	–26.7
Turnout		3,381	44.1	+4.2
Registered electors		7,659		
Labour hold		Swing	▼13.4	

=== Westdene ===
Westdene
Party	Candidate	Votes	%	±%
Conservative	J. Drake	2,484	61.6	+7.3
Alliance	D. Roberts	995	24.7	–3.6
Labour	F. Spicer	466	11.6	–6.6
Green	M. Rhinds	87	2.2	N/A
Majority		1,489	36.9	+11.8
Turnout		4,032	53.9	+2.7
Registered electors		7,483		
Conservative hold		Swing	▲5.5	

=== Woodingdean ===
Woodingdean
Party	Candidate	Votes	%	±%
Conservative	D. Smith*	2,685	61.5	+8.4
Labour	J. Newington	838	19.2	–12.1
Alliance	J. Marshall	759	17.4	+1.8
Green	R. Sharratt	82	1.9	N/A
Majority		1,847	42.3	+20.4
Turnout		4,364	54.4	+6.7
Registered electors		8,018		
Conservative hold		Swing	▲10.3	
