= Borough of Brighton =

Former district, English

Coordinates: 50.8208°N 0.1401°W

Brighton
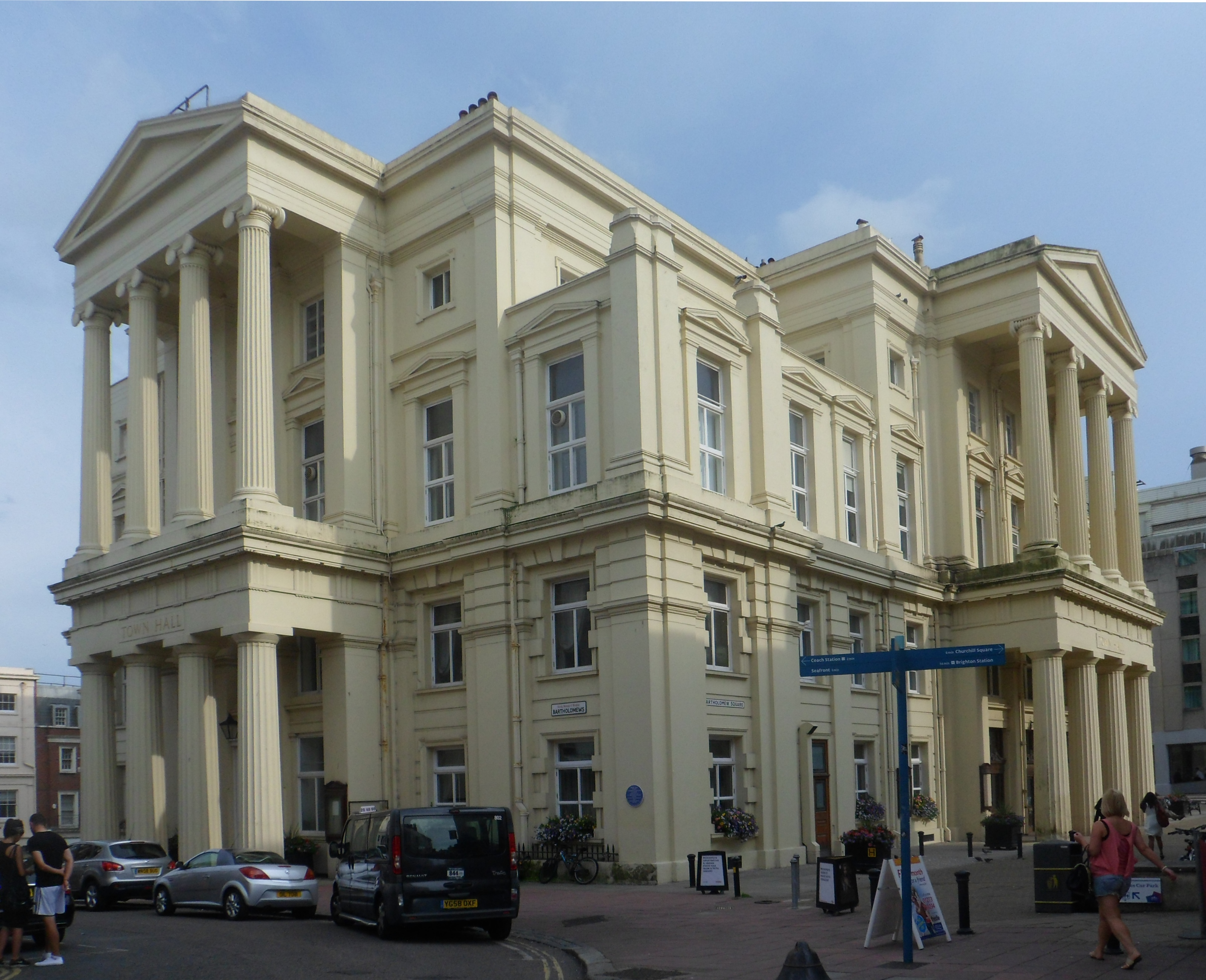
- Population
  - 1961: 163,159
- History
  - Created: 1854
  - Abolished: 1997
  - Succeeded by: Brighton and Hove
- Status: Municipal borough 1854 – 1889 County borough 1889 – 1974 non-metropolitan district, borough 1974 – 1997

Brighton was a non-metropolitan district with borough status of East Sussex, England covering the town of Brighton. Formed in 1854 as a municipal borough, in 1889 it became a county borough independent of the newly formed East Sussex County Council, and from 1974 until its dissolution in 1997 it was a non-metropolitan district within the county of East Sussex. In 1997 it merged with the Borough of Hove to become the Borough of Brighton and Hove. In 1961, the district had a population of 163,159.

== History ==
Brighton Improvement Act 1772
- Act of Parliament
- Parliament of Great Britain
- Long title: An Act for paving, lighting, and cleaning the Streets, Lanes, and Places, within the Town of Brighthelmstone, in the County of Sussex; for removing Nuisances and Annoyances, and preventing the like for the future; for holding and regulating a Market within the said Town; for building and repairing Groyns, in order to render the Coast safe and commodious for Ships or Vessels to unload and land Sea Coal, Culm, and other Coal, for the Use of the Inhabitants of the said Town, and for laying a Duty thereon: and for other Purposes.
- Citation: 13 Geo. 3. c. 34
- Territorial extent: Great Britain

Dates
- Royal assent: 7 April 1773
- Commencement: 26 November 1772 (Note: Start of session.)
- Repealed: 22 June 1825
Other legislation
Repealed by	Brighthelmston Improvement and Poor Relief Act 1825

Status: Repealed

Text of statute as originally enacted

Brighthelmstone Improvement Act 1810
- Act of Parliament
- Parliament of the United Kingdom
- Long title: An Act to repeal an Act made in the Thirteenth Year of His present Majesty, for paving, lighting and cleansing the Town of Brighthelmstone, in the County of Sussex, and removing and preventing Nuisances and Annoyances therein; for regulating the Market; for building and repairing Groyns to render the Coast safe and commodious; for landing Coal and Culm, and laying a Duty thereon, and for making other Provisions in lieu thereof; and for regulating Weights and Measures, and building a Town Hall.
- Citation: 50 Geo. 3. c. xxxviii
- Territorial extent: United Kingdom

Dates
- Royal assent: 18 April 1810
- Commencement: 18 April 1810 (Note: The Acts of Parliament (Commencement) Act 1793.)
- Repealed: 22 June 1825
Other legislation
Repeals/revokes	Brighton Improvement Act 1772
Repealed by	Brighthelmston Improvement and Poor Relief Act 1825

Status: Repealed

Text of statute as originally enacted

Brighthelmston Improvement and Poor Relief Act 1825
- Act of Parliament
- Parliament of the United Kingdom
- Long title: An Act for the better regulating, paving, improving, and managing the Town of Brighthelmston in the County of Sussex, and the Poor thereof.
- Citation: 6 Geo. 4. c. clxxix
- Territorial extent: United Kingdom

Dates
- Royal assent: 22 June 1825
- Commencement: 22 June 1825
Other legislation
Repeals/revokes	Brighton Improvement Act 1772; Brighthelmstone Improvement Act 1810

Status: Current legislation

Text of statute as originally enacted

Both Charles II, in 1684, and the Prince Regent (Prince of Wales), in 1806, favoured the incorporation of Brighton as a borough, but both of these suggestions came to nothing – the latter because it was likely to cost too much. In 1773 an act of Parliament, the Brighton Improvement Act 1772 (13 Geo. 3. c. 34), resulted in the formation of the Brighton Town Commissioners, 64 men who had control of certain municipal and administrative affairs and who were elected by the townspeople. Their powers were extended by the Brighthelmstone Improvement Act 1810 (50 Geo. 3. c. xxxviii), which also increased the number of commissioners from 64 to 106.

Brighton Commissioners Transfer Act 1855 (Note: Section 12.)
- Act of Parliament
- Parliament of the United Kingdom
- Long title: An Act to transfer to the Corporation of the Town of Brighton the Property, Powers, Privileges, and Liabilities of the Brighton Improvement Commissioners.
- Citation: 18 & 19 Vict. c. vi
- Territorial extent: United Kingdom

Dates
- Royal assent: 5 May 1855
- Commencement: 29 May 1855 (Note: Section 11.)
Other legislation
Repealed by	Brighton Corporation Act 1931

Status: Repealed

Text of statute as originally enacted

More attempts to incorporate as a borough were made in 1848 and 1852 without success, but another petition to the Privy Council and subsequent inquiry in August 1853 found favour, and on 19 January 1854 the Municipal Borough of Brighton was awarded a charter. The borough was then officially incorporated on 1 April 1854 under the terms of the Municipal Corporations Act 1835. At that time the borough had six wards, each returning six councillors; the first elections were held on 30 May 1854. The Brighton Town Commissioners were dissolved the following year by the Brighton Commissioners Transfer Act 1855 (18 & 19 Vict. c. vi) and all "property, powers, privileges and liabilities" were passed over to the Borough Council, including Brighton Town Hall and the Royal Pavilion.

Following the passing of the Local Government Act 1888, Brighton became a county borough independent of the newly formed East Sussex County Council with effect from 1 April 1889. On 1 April 1952 the district gained parts of Falmer and Stanmer parishes from Chailey Rural District, having previously been expanded in 1873 with territory taken from the parish of Preston. Changes to the composition of, and additions to the number of, wards took place at various times, not just when the borough boundaries expanded: the original six wards became seven in 1873 with the creation of a new Preston ward, then these seven were divided into 14 in 1894; from 1928 there were 19, and this number remained until 1983 despite changes to ward boundaries in 1952 and 1955. The changes of 1983 resulted in there being 16 wards in the borough.

On 1 April 1974 the district was reconstituted a non-metropolitan district within the non-metropolitan county of East Sussex, thus being governed by East Sussex County Council for the first time. At this point the county council took responsibility for refuse disposal, libraries, education, social services and fire protection; the borough council remained responsible for collecting refuse, planning services, housing, environmental health, parks and highways.

On 1 April 1997, the district was abolished and merged with the Borough of Hove to form "Brighton and Hove", a non-metropolitan district with its own council, meaning Brighton was again not governed by East Sussex County Council.

== Coat of arms ==
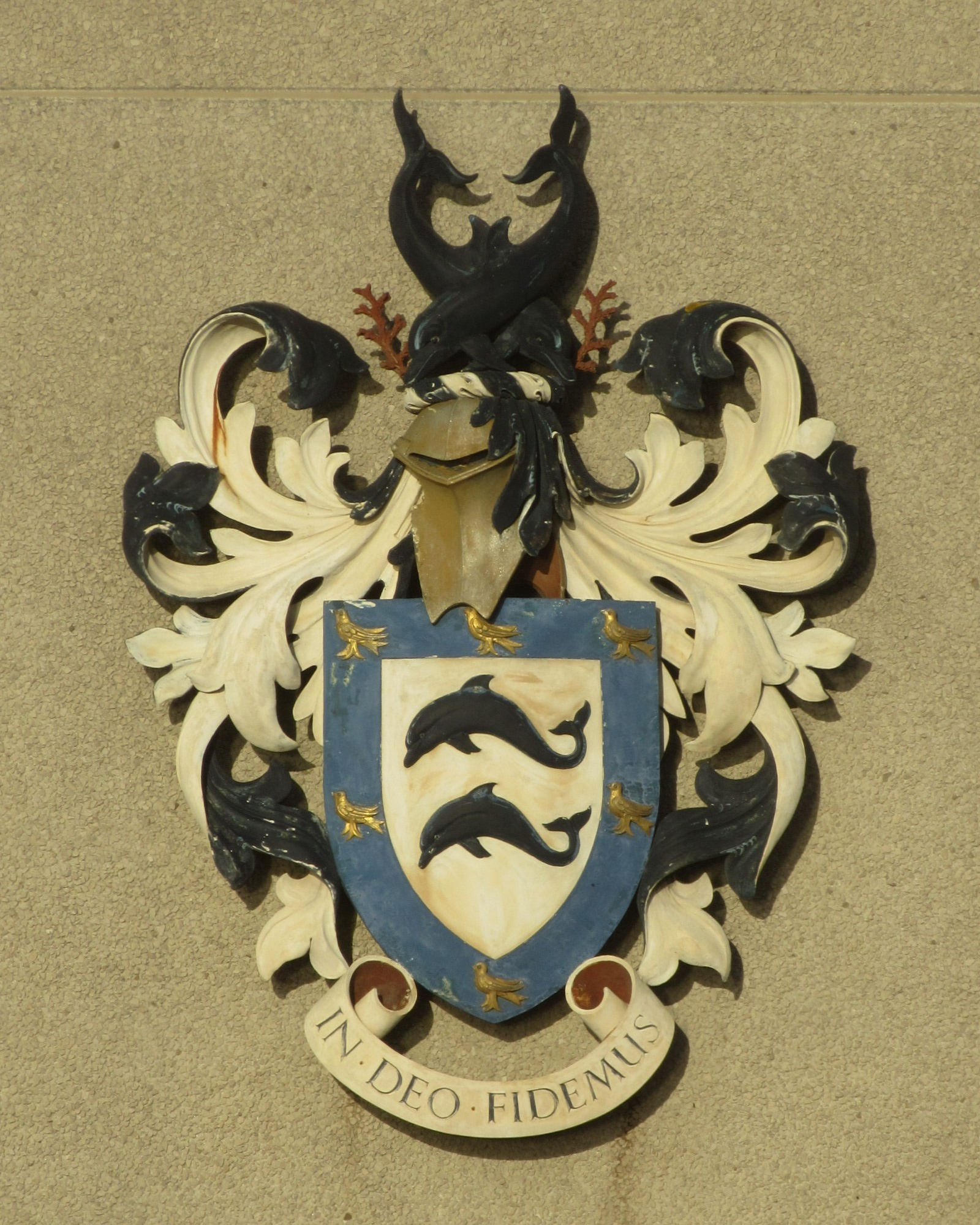
The borough coat of arms on the Brighton Centre, King's Road

The borough was granted a coat of arms on 14 April 1897. A simplified version was used from 1974. The formal description is "Argent, two dolphins naiant sable, a bordure azure, charged with six martlets or. And for the crest, on a wreath of the colours, two dolphins in saltire, heads downwards, sable, between as many branches of coral gules".

== Freedom of the borough ==
The honorary Freedom of the Borough of Brighton was, during the borough's existence, awarded by the council to these "persons of distinction, and persons who have, in the opinion of the council, rendered eminent service to the borough":

- Garnet Wolseley, 1st Viscount Wolseley (1898)
- John French, 1st Earl of Ypres (1903)
- Douglas Haig, 1st Earl Haig (1920)
- David Beatty, 1st Earl Beatty (1922)
- Charles Thomas-Stanford of Preston Manor (1925)
- Ellen Thomas-Stanford of Preston Manor (1925)
- Herbert Carden, alderman and former mayor (1926)
- Benjamin James Saunders (1937)
- The Royal Sussex Regiment (1944)
- Winston Churchill (1947)
- Hugh Milner Black, alderman and former mayor (1948)
- Dorothy Stringer, alderman and former mayor (1968)
- William Dodd (1972), town clerk

== Parishes ==
Until 1974 the district included the parish of Brighton and until 1928 it also included the parish of Preston, both were urban parishes thus didn't have their own parish council or meeting. In 1974 the district became an unparished area, on 14 December 1995 the parish of Rottingdean was formed from part of Brighton unparished area which split Saltdean from the rest of the unparished area.

== See also ==
- Brighton Borough Council elections
- Brighton Borough Police
- Public services in Brighton and Hove

== Bibliography ==
- Carder, Timothy (1990). The Encyclopaedia of Brighton. Lewes: East Sussex County Libraries. ISBN 0-86147-315-9.
