= Downfall =

Downfall may refer to:

== Books ==
- The Downfall (novel), an 1892 book by Émile Zola
- Downfall: The End of the Imperial Japanese Empire, a 1999 book by Richard B. Frank about the last days of World War II
- Downfall, a 2001 Dragonlance novel by Jean Rabe
- Downfall, a 2007 novel in the LEGO Bionicle Legends series
- Downfall (McCombes book), a 2011 book about the political career of Tommy Sheridan
- Downfall (Dorries book), a 2024 book by Nadine Dorries
- Downfall (manga), a 2017 manga series by Inio Asano

== Film and television ==
- Downfall (1923 film), a 1923 German silent film
- The Downfall (1961 film) (Greek: Kataforos), a Greek film
- Downfall (1964 film), a British film
- The Downfall (1990 film), an Egyptian film starring Madiha Kamel
- Downfall (1997 film), a 1997 Korean film starring Shin Eun-gyeong
- "Downfall" (RahXephon episode), of the 2002 Japanese anime television series
- Downfall (2004 film) (German: Der Untergang), a 2004 German film about the final days of Nazi Germany as well as the final days of the life of its leader, Adolf Hitler
- Dead Space: Downfall, a 2008 animated science fiction film
- Downfall (game show), a 2010 American game show hosted by Chris Jericho
- Downfall: The Case Against Boeing, a 2022 documentary film about two fatal crashes of the Boeing 737 MAX and the subsequent investigations

== Music ==
- Downfall (band), a Californian punk rock band

=== Albums ===
- Downfall (Solitude Aeturnus album), 1996
- Downfall (The Gathering album), 2001
- "Downfall", a 2015 EP by From Ashes to New
- My Downfall (Original Soundtrack), a 2007 album by breakcore artist Venetian Snares

=== Songs ===
- "Downfall" (Children of Bodom song), 1998
- "Downfall" (Matchbox Twenty song), 2004
- "Downfall" (Trust Company song), 2002
- "Downfall", a song by Architects from their 2016 album All Our Gods Have Abandoned Us
- "Downfall", a song by Dir En Grey from their 2018 album The Insulated World
- "Downfall", a song by Exodus from their 2010 album Exhibit B: The Human Condition
- "Downfall", a song by From Ashes to New from their 2016 album Day One
- "Downfall", a song by Issues from their 2019 album Beautiful Oblivion
- "Downfall", a song by Lacuna Coil from their 2016 album Delirium
- "The Downfall", a song by Gardenian from their 1997 album Two Feet Stand

== Other uses ==
- Downfall (game), a two-player strategy game from Milton Bradley Company
- Downfall (2009 video game), a horror adventure game developed by Harvester Games
- The Downfall (mountain), in Antarctica
- Operation Downfall, the Allied plan for the invasion of Japan at the end of World War II
- Downfall (security vulnerability), a computer security vulnerability in Intel processors
