= Christian Legal Centre =

UK Christian legal support organization

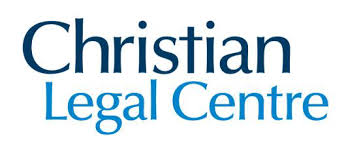
- Abbreviation: CLC
- Formation: December 2007
- Headquarters: 70 Wimpole Street, London
- Region served: United Kingdom
- Director: Andrea Williams
- Website: christianconcern.com/about/services/christian-legal-centre/

The Christian Legal Centre (CLC), a company founded in December 2007, has acted in a number of high-profile cases on behalf of evangelical Christians in the United Kingdom. Its sister organisation is Christian Concern. Observers believe that the centre has adopted tactics from wealthy evangelical groups in the US, notably the Alliance Defense Fund, and raise questions about its funding. It opposes homosexuality, same-sex marriage, pre-marital sex, and pornography.

== Cases ==
Since its inception, the CLC has involved itself in a number of cases in the UK.

=== 2008 ===
==== Blasphemy ====
In 2008 the CLC represented Emily Mapfuwa, a Christian who began a prosecution of the Baltic Centre for Contemporary Art in Gateshead for exhibiting a statue by Terence Koh of Jesus with an erection. In a BBC Essex radio interview, Michael Phillips (a CLC solicitor who is also a member of the Lawyers' Christian Fellowship) said that Mapfuwa had never visited the exhibition; she lives over 250 miles (400 km) away, in Brentwood, Essex. The case was halted by the Crown Prosecution Service.

==== Hybrid embryo research ====
The CLC and Comment on Reproductive Ethics (CORE) were refused permission to apply for a judicial review to overturn the Human Fertilisation and Embryology Authority's decision to allow laboratory testing of human–animal hybrid embryos. At the High Court in London, Justice Linda Dobbs ruled that the application was without merit and ordered the CLC to pay costs which amounted to about £20,000.

==== Employment termination for homophobia ====
Graham Cogman, a police constable from Norfolk, was fired for sending emails to colleagues in which he quoted biblical passages condemning homosexuality and forwarded information about a group which offered to "cure" homosexuals. Cogman launched a complaint at an employment tribunal, supported by the CLC, claiming harassment due to his religious beliefs. He lost his case.

=== 2010 ===
==== Employment termination for homophobia (McFarlane v Relate Avon Ltd) ====
Gary McFarlane, a counselor for Relate (a relationship support charity), was fired after raising a conscientious objection to assisting same-sex couples with sexual issues. Relate admitted wrongful dismissal, conceding that McFarlane should have been given notice instead of being summarily dismissed for "gross misconduct". Complaints of unfair dismissal and discrimination on the grounds of religion were dismissed. An appeal of the ruling was dismissed by the High Court in April 2010, and an application to the European Court of Human Rights was unsuccessful.

==== Employment discrimination for wearing a crucifix ====
Shirley Chaplin, a nurse supported by the CLC, made an unsuccessful bid to sue the Royal Devon and Exeter NHS Trust for discrimination because it had moved her to a desk job after she refused to remove a cross necklace when asked to do so on health and safety grounds; hospital dress code prohibits front-line staff from wearing any type of necklace, in case patients try to grab it. The hospital had offered Chaplin a compromise of wearing her cross pinned inside a lapel or pocket. An employment tribunal ruled that they acted reasonably in April 2010, rejecting Chaplin's case. Chaplin tried unsuccessfully to obtain a ruling against the UK government at the European Court of Human Rights.

==== Employment termination for evangelism ====
Duke Amachree, a homelessness officer, was fired by the Wandsworth Council for subjecting a client to a "30-minute barrage" of evangelism when he was supposed to be offering her housing advice. The client complained to the council, leading to an investigation. The council said that Amachree revealed "sensitive personal information" about the client in an interview with the Daily Mail after the CLC became involved. The CLC supported Amachree in an unsuccessful legal claim for unfair dismissal, religious discrimination, and breach of contract.

=== 2011: Foster care ===
Eunice and Owen Johns, a Christian couple, applied to the Derby City Council to become foster parents. They withdrew their application after a social worker expressed concern when they said they could not tell a child that a homosexual lifestyle was acceptable. The two parties agreed to take the case to the High Court for clarification of the law. The court decided in favour of the city council, saying that laws protecting people from discrimination because of their sexual orientation "should take precedence" over the right not to be discriminated against on religious grounds.

=== 2016: Suspension for harassment of Muslim colleague ===
Victoria Wasteney, a senior occupational therapist and head of forensic therapy at the John Howard Centre (a mental-health unit of the East London NHS Foundation Trust), was suspended for nine months for "harassing and bullying" a junior Muslim colleague and received a written warning after an investigation. Wasteney had received an informal warning for arranging services by her church at the unit at which other staff felt pressured to sing and dance and donate to the church. The CLC supported an appeal to the Employment Appeal Tribunal, where Judge Eady QC found that Wasteney's treatment was not because of her Christian beliefs but because of her inappropriate behaviour.

=== 2018: Alfie Evans case ===
The CLC became involved in the latter stages of the Alfie Evans case. Their involvement was unsuccessful, and was criticised by the judge.

A High Court judge expressed concern about the conduct of CLC consultant Pavel Stroilov during the case. Mr. Justice Hayden described Stroilov as a "fanatical and deluded young man" whose "malign hand" was "inconsistent with the real interests of the parents' case." The judge accused CLC activists of doing Evans' parents "far more harm than it does them good", and said that their submissions were "littered with vituperation and bile". The CLC submissions, which said that "Alfie's best interests are irrelevant" when compared to his parents' wishes, were described as a "startling proposition" by Justice Hayden. The CLC called the judges' comments "unfair." Mary Holmes, former solicitor for Evans' parents, accused the CLC of exploiting the case for their own benefit.

Three court-of-appeal judges said that a letter from Stroilov to the parents of Alfie Evans was "misleading to the extent of giving the father false advice". The letter advised Evans' father that it would be lawful to remove Alfie from Alder Hey Hospital. The court heard that this led to a confrontation at the hospital in which Alfie was involved, and police were called. An appellate judge said that the letter was "disseminated on social media (presumably with the knowledge of Mr Stroilov)".

=== 2019 ===
==== Expulsion from university for homophobia ====
Felix Ngole, a student social-care worker, was removed from a course at the University of Sheffield in 2016 after engaging in a Facebook debate where he said that homosexuality was a sin. His comments were deemed homophobic. The High Court upheld the university's decision in 2017, but the Court of Appeal ruled two years later that "the mere expression of religious views about sin does not necessarily connote discrimination."

==== Dismissal from Gloucestershire School for homophobia ====
Kristie Higgs, 47, was dismissed for gross misconduct by Farmor’s School in Fairford, Gloucestershire, in 2019 after sharing Facebook posts criticising plans to teach about LGBT+ relationships in primary schools. In 2024, Higgs won the right to appeal her dismissal.

=== 2020 ===
==== Employment termination for transphobia and Islamophobia ====
The CLC represented teacher Joshua Sutcliffe, who was fired from two schools for misgendering a transgender boy and for comments made about Islam in a YouTube video. Sutcliffe, who blamed the loss of his jobs on the "LGBT+ mafia" and the "Islamic mafia", reached an undisclosed settlement with one of the schools.

==== Transgender children in school ====
Christian parents Nigel and Sally Rowe took legal action after their son saw another boy wearing a dress and was "confused". The Rowes received £22,000 for legal costs from the UK's Department for Education.

=== 2021: Employment termination for homophobia ===
Magistrate Richard Page was fired for objecting to an adoption application by a same-sex couple, and was also suspended from his role at the Kent and Medway NHS and Social Care Partnership Trust. After an unsuccessful Court of Appeal challenge against his dismissal which was supported by the CLC, Page was told by Lord Justice Underhill that he had shown himself "incapable of honouring his undertaking" as an unbiased magistrate.

=== 2022 ===
==== Cross-wearing at work ====
The CLC supported nurse Mary Onuoha, who was "victimised" for wearing a small cross on duty. She refused to remove the cross, citing the widespread wearing of jewellery and other religious apparel by other staff members. The Employment Tribunal ruled that she had been discriminated against and harassed, saying: "There was no proper explanation as to why those items were permitted but a cross-necklace was not".

==== Life-support withdrawal ====
Archie Battersbee, a 12-year-old boy, was diagnosed as brain-dead by the Royal London Hospital. His parents were assisted by the CLC in arguing unsuccessfully that his life support treatment should continue.

=== 2023: Dismissal for homophobia ===
Bernard Randall (a chaplain at the independent Trent College boarding school) objected to the school partnering with an LGBT+ charity, refused to engage in training activities involving the charity, and was dismissed in 2019 after being referred to an anti-terrorism programme because of a sermon in which he told students that it was all right to not accept "LGBT ideology". An employment-tribunal judge ruled that safeguarding concerns and a requirement to comply with standards regulations outweighed Randall's right to express his beliefs in a school environment.

=== 2025: Trans women using women's changing rooms ===
The CLC alongside J. K. Rowling supported a group of eight nurses suing their employer, Darlington Memorial Hospital, for allowing a trans woman to use women's changing facilities since 2019.

== Other activities ==
The Christian Legal Centre, Christian Concern and the Alliance Defending Freedom launched the Wilberforce Academy, a Christian residential programme, in 2010. The one-week conference trains students and young professionals to apply Christianity to their vocations. Some of its attendees go on to work for the Christian Legal Centre and Christian Concern. The programme has often been held at Oxbridge colleges, prompting complaints from students. In 2022, a reporter for The Daily Telegraph called Worcester College, Oxford's cancellation of the programme an example of cancel culture.

== Criticism and scrutiny ==
In 2011, The Guardian raised questions over how the CLC is funded and noted structural similarities to the Alliance Defense Fund, an American conservative-Christian legal-advocacy group. According to Keith Porteous Wood of the National Secular Society, "[the CLC] don't seem so keen to support religious liberty for Muslims or atheists". The centre was the subject of a November 2018 BBC Radio documentary, A Tale of Belief and the Courts, written and presented by Joshua Rozenberg.

The pseudonymous "Secret Barrister" criticised the CLC and other fundamentalist groups in their 2020 book, Fake Law. The author accused the groups of "casting a fog over the facts and drilling into our deepest and most primal fears" while "pushing their own agendas". CLC consultant Pavel Stroilov called the book "an elitist rant".

== Notable people ==
=== Andrea Minichiello Williams ===
Evangelical activist and barrister Andrea Minichiello Williams is chief executive of the CLC and Christian Concern. She began public-policy work with the Lawyers' Christian Fellowship (LCF) during the 1990s, opposing the liberalisation of laws governing civil partnerships and the status of embryos. A member of the General Synod of the Church of England, Williams called on gay Christians (whom she called the "children of the devil") to "repent" and advocated the expulsion of gay priests from the Church of England. Williams has publicly opposed the Church of England's decision to support civil partnerships.

She reportedly called the Human Fertilisation Bill "the work of the devil" and homosexuality sinful, said that abortion should be illegal, and the world is around 4,000 years old. Williams has called abortion a "silent holocaust", and sees abortion laws as "the work of Satan."

The Channel 4 Dispatches documentary "In God's Name", which first aired on 19 May 2008, featured Williams and documented her lobbying the British Government on abortion, gay rights and the enforcement of laws relating to blasphemy. The programme included footage of Williams' meetings with Conservative politicians Norman Tebbit and Nadine Dorries, both of whom have worked with the LCF to influence policy on matters where they had a common agenda. When director David Modell asked Williams if she believes Islam is the "work of the devil", Williams replied: "I believe that Islam is a false religion, yes." In the documentary, Williams addresses the LCF's track record of losing cases by saying "it's vital that these issues are aired and won in the court room." David Modell concluded that "perhaps one of the problems is that she relies on evidence that has no apparent basis in reality." Williams discussed her involvement in the Andrew case; McClintock is a magistrate who opposes gay adoption cases and received support from the LCF. According to Williams, "It's not about the oppression of the homosexual community, but the evidence shows that children raised in those households are more likely to be gender confused, more likely to be drug-dependent, more likely to not finish school".

==== Relationship with Nadine Dorries ====
Williams had a close working relationship with British Conservative politician Nadine Dorries. She was a team member of Dorries' campaign to reduce the upper limit on abortion to 20 weeks (a campaign partly funded by Christian Concern), and wrote Dorries' anti-abortion amendments. In the Channel 4 Dispatches documentary, "In God's Name", Dorries was asked how closely she worked with Williams and replied, "Closely? We've been stuck to the hip. Very closely." About her campaign, Dorries added:

What goes on in here would have no structure whatsover, no sense of achievement if it wasn't for people like Andrea on the outside. You know, the Lawyers' Christian Fellowship, the Medical Christian Fellowship [sic] on this particular issue are absolutely vital because they give us the information.

In the documentary, Dorries said that she had not discussed Williams' views on Islam. Williams (who sat next to her) said, "I believe that Islam is a false religion" and switched off her microphone.

=== Pavel Stroilov ===
Stroilov, a consultant for the CLC, says that he is an exiled Russian dissident who smuggled top-secret Kremlin files into Britain after stealing them from the Gorbachev Foundation's archives. During his work on the Alfie Evans case, a judge described his behaviour as “profoundly depressing, to say the least". Stroilov was an aide for former UKIP leader Gerard Batten when Batten was an MEP. Batten and Stroilov co-authored a book, The Inglorious Revolution. Stroilov advised the parents of Alfie Evans to pursue a private prosecution for conspiracy murder against doctors at Alder Hey Children's Hospital.

=== Bruno Quintavalle ===
The CLC works closely with Italian lawyer Bruno Quintavalle, former leader of the anti-abortion political party ProLife Alliance. Quintavallee, who worked on the Alfie Evans and Archie Battersbee cases, campaigned to repeal the Human Fertilisation and Embryology Act.

== See also ==
- Christian Institute
- Evangelical Alliance
- Christian Action, Research and Education
- Christian Voice (UK)
