= Vladimir Bukovsky bibliography =

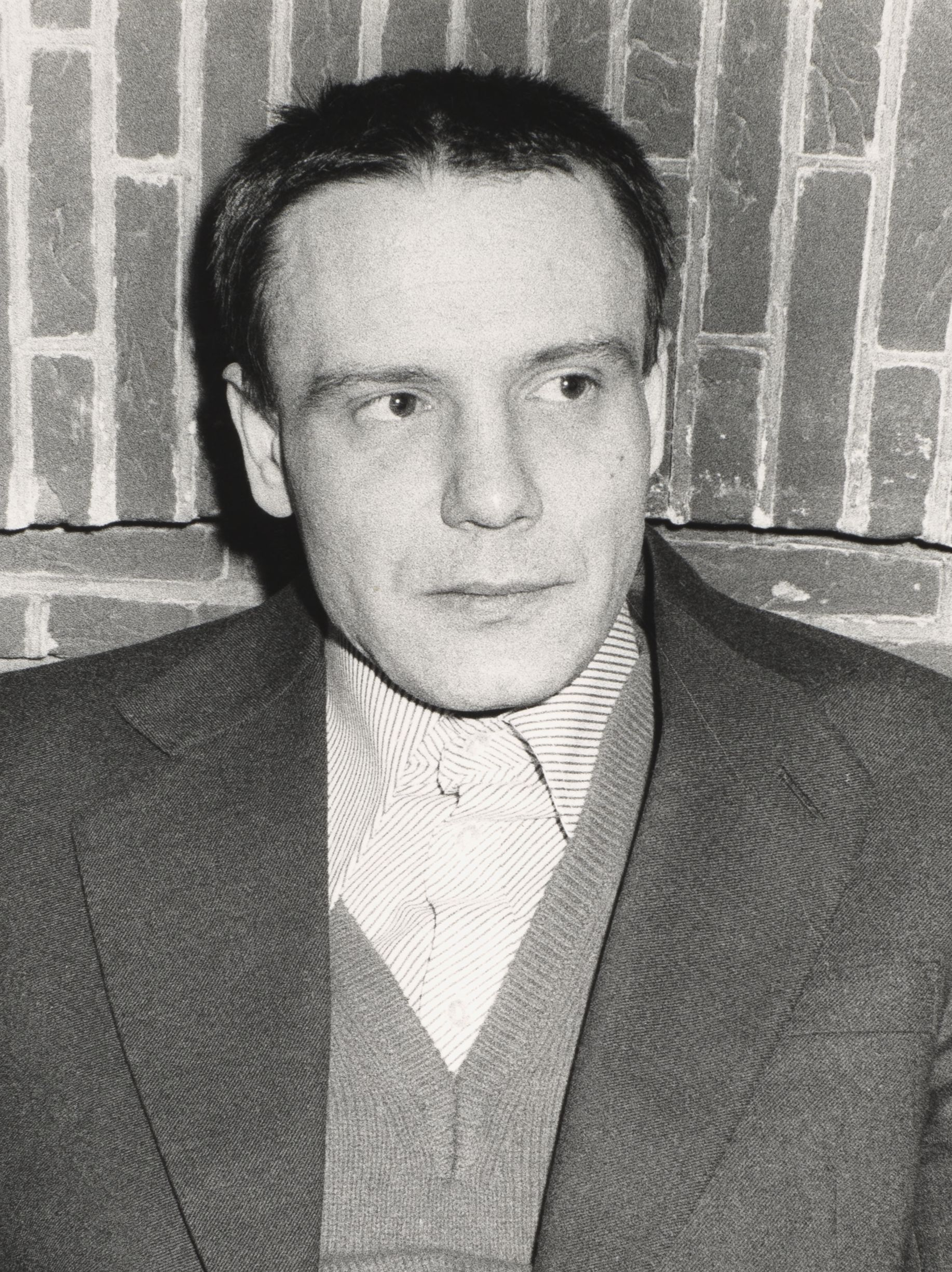
Vladimir Bukovsky

Vladimir Bukovsky (30 December 1942 - 27 October 2019) was prominent in the Soviet dissident movement of the 1960s and 1970s. A writer, neurophysiologist, and activist, he is celebrated for his part in the campaign to expose and halt the political abuse of psychiatry in the Soviet Union. Since being expelled from the USSR in late 1976 he remained in active and vocal opposition to the Soviet system and the shortcomings of its successor regimes in Russia.

A list of publications by Vladimir Bukovsky in other languages is available below and on the website of the Gratitude Fund.

== Books ==
- To Build A Castle: My Life as a Dissenter (1978)
  - To Build a Castle: My Life as a Dissenter (PDF). London: André Deutsch. 1978. ISBN 978-0-233-97023-3. Archived from the original (PDF) on 2013-05-01. 352 pp.
  - To Build a Castle: My Life as a Dissenter. Translated by Scammell, Michael. New York: Viking Press. 1979. ISBN 978-0-670-71640-1.
  - И возвращается ветер [To Build a Castle] (in Russian). New York: Изд. «Хроника». 1979. p. 384.
  - И возвращается ветер [To Build a Castle]. Teatr: Literaturno-Chudožestvennyj Žurnal (in Russian). М.: Teatr periodical. 1989. ISSN 0131-6885.
  - И возвращается ветер [To Build a Castle]. Свободный человек (in Russian). М.: Новое изд-во. 2007. p. 348. ISBN 978-5-98379-090-2.
- Schaeffer, Francis; Bukovsky, Vladimir; Hitchcock, James (1983). Who Is for Peace?. Thomas Nelson Incorporated. ISBN 978-0-8407-5386-1.
- Bukovsky, Vladimir (1987). To Choose Freedom. Hoover Press publication. Denise H. Wood (trans.); Alexis Klimoff (ed.). Stanford, Calif: Hoover Institution Press. ISBN 978-0-8179-8442-7.
- Hook, Sidney; Bukovsky, Vladimir; Hollander, Paul (1987). Soviet Hypocrisy and Western Gullibility. Ethics & Public Policy Center. ISBN 978-0-89633-113-6.
- Vladimir Bukovsky and Pavel Stroilov (2004), EUSSR: The Soviet roots of European Integration, 48 pp.
- Judgment in Moscow: Soviet Crimes and Western Hypocrisy (1995)
  - Московский процесс [Judgment in Moscow] (in Russian). М.; Париж: МИК: Рус. мысль. 1996. p. 525. ISBN 978-5-87902-071-7.
  - Judgment in Moscow: Soviet crimes and Western complicity. Ninth of November Press. 2019. 729pp.

Untranslated

- Пацифисты против мира [Pacifists Against Peace] (in Russian). Paris: La Presse Libra. 1982.
- Письма русского путешественника [Letters of a Russian traveler] (in Russian). New York: Chalidze publications. 1981.
- Письма русского путешественника [Letters of a Russian traveler]. Moscow & St Petersburg: Нестор-История [Nestor-History]. 2008.
- Наследники Лаврентия Берия. Путин и его команда [The heirs of Lavrenty Beria: Putin and his team]. M.: Алгоритм. 2013. ISBN 978-5-4438-0337-1.
- Тайная империя Путина. Будет ли "дворцовый переворот"? [Putin's secret empire. Will there be a "palace coup"?]. M.: Алгоритм. 2014. ISBN 978-5-4438-0880-2.
- На краю. Тяжелый выбор России [On the edge. Russia faces a hard choice]. M.: Алгоритм. 2015. ISBN 978-5-906798-82-4.

== Other languages, 1970s to 2010s ==
(French, German, Italian)

=== 1970s ===
- Boukovsky, Vladimir (1971). Une nouvelle maladie mentale en URSS: l'opposition [A new mental illness in the USSR: the opposition] (in French). Paris: Le Seuil. ISBN 978-2020025270.
- Bukowski, Wladimir (1971). UdSSR. Opposition. Eine neue Geisteskrankheit in der Sowjetunion? Eine Dokumentation von W. Bukowskij [The USSR. Opposition. A new mental illness in the Soviet Union? Documentation by V. Bukovsky] (in German). München: Carl Hanser Verlag. ISBN 978-3-446-11571-2.
- Bukovskij, Vladimir (1972). Una nuova malattia mentale in Urss: l'opposizione [A new mental illness in the USSR: opposition] (in Italian). Milan: Etas Kompass.
- Bukovsky, Vladimir (1972). Una nueva enfermedad mental en la U.R.S.S.: la oposición [A new mental illness in the USSR: opposition] (in Spanish). México: Lasser Press.
- Bukowskij, Wladimir (1972). Der unbequeme Zeuge – Eine Dokumentation Herausgegeben von Cornelia Gerstenmaier [The inconvenient witness – a documentation edited by Cornelia Gerstenmaier] (in German). Stuttgart: Seewald Verlag. ISBN 978-3-512-00235-9.
- Bukovskiĭ, Vladimir; Gluzman, Semyon (1975e). Håndbog i psykiatri for afvigere [A manual on psychiatry for dissidents] (in Danish). Göteborg: Samarbetsdynamik AB. ISBN 9185396001. OCLC 7551381.
- Boukovsky, Vladimir; Glouzmann, Semion (September 1975). "Guide de psychiatrie pour les dissidents soviétiques: dédié à Lonia Pliouchtch, victime de la terreur psychiatrique" [Guide on psychiatry for Soviet dissidents: dedicated to Lyonya Plyushch, a victim of psychiatric terror]. Esprit (in French). 449 (9): 307–332. JSTOR 24263203.
- Bukovskij, Vladimir; Gluzman, Semen; Leva, Marco (1979). Guida psichiatrica per dissidenti. Con esempi pratici e una lettera dal Gulag [Psychiatric guide for dissidents. With practical examples and a letter from the Gulag] (in Italian). Milan: L'erba voglio. ASIN B00E3B4JK4.
- Bukowski, Wladimir; Gluzman, Semen (1976). "Psychiatrie-handbuch für dissidenten" [A manual on psychiatry for dissidents]. Samisdat. Stimmen aus dem "anderen Rußland" (in German) (8). Bern: 29–48.

=== 1980s ===
- Boukovsky, Vladimir (1981). Cette lancinante douleur de la liberté: lettres d'un résistant russe aux Occidentaux [The throbbing pain of freedom: letters by Russian-resistant Westerners] (in French). Paris: Robert Laffont Libertés 2000. ISBN 978-2221007075.
- Bujak, Zbigniew; Boukovsky, Vladimir (December 1984). "Libre correspondance" [Free correspondence]. Esprit (in French). 96 (12): 146–149. JSTOR 24270299.
- Boukovsky, Vladimir (1982). "Témoignage" [Testimony]. In Galanskov, Youri (ed.). Le manifeste humain précédé par les témoignages de V. Boukovsky, N. Gorbanevskaïa, A. Guinzbourg, E. Kouznetsov [Human manifesto preceded by testimonies of V. Bukovsky, N. Gorbanevskaya, A. Ginzburg, E. Kuznetsov] (in French). Lausanne: Editions L'Age d'Homme. pp. 27–31. ISBN 978-2825109205.
- Voren, Robert van; Bukovskiĭ, Vladimir (1988). Gorbatsjov, tussen hoop en illusie [Gorbachev, between hope and illusion] (in Dutch). Buijten & Schipperheijn. ISBN 978-90-6064-673-1.

=== 1990s ===
- Jugement a Moscou: un dissident dans les archives du Kremlin (in French). Paris: Robert Laffont. 1995. ISBN 978-2-221-07460-2. 616 pp.
- Московский процесс (in Russian). Paris & Moscow: Russkaya mysl. 1996.
- Moskiewski proces (in Polish). Warsaw. 1999. ISBN 978-83-7227-190-7.

=== 2000s ===
- Bukovskiĭ, Vladimir; Bykaŭ, Vasilʹ; Suvorov, Viktor (2001). La mentalità comunista [The communist mentality] (in Italian). Spirali. ISBN 9788877705723.
- Bukovsky, Vladimir; Stroilov, Pavel (2005). L'Union européenne, une nouvelle URSS? (in French). Le Rocher. ISBN 978-2-268-05546-6.
