= The Cat Lady =

2012 video game

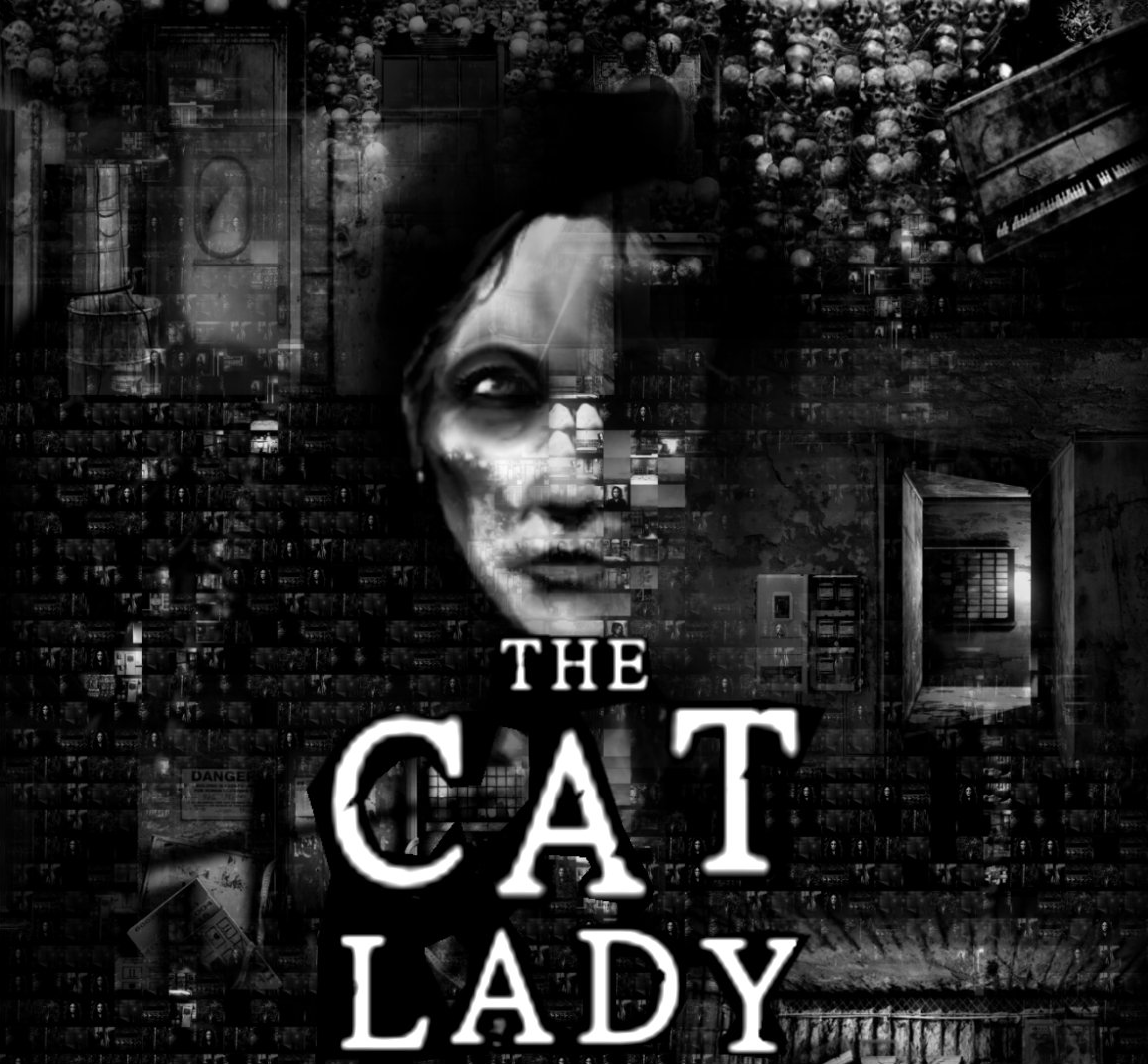
- Developer: Harvester Games
- Publisher: Screen 7
- Designer: Remigiusz Michalski
- Programmers: Remigiusz Michalski, James Spanos
- Artist: Remigiusz Michalski
- Composer: Michal Michalski
- Engine: Adventure Game Studio
- Platforms: Windows, Linux
- Release: WW: December 7, 2012; WW: April 20, 2014 (Linux)
- Genre: Graphic adventure
- Mode: Single-player

The Cat Lady is a 2012 Polish horror graphic adventure game developed by Harvester Games and published by Screen 7 for Microsoft Windows and Linux. It is part of the Devil Came Through Here trilogy alongside Downfall (2016) and Lorelai (2019).

It follows Susan Ashworth, a depressed woman who commits suicide, but comes back to life as an immortal and receives the mission to eliminate five serial killers known as Parasites.

The Cat Lady deals with mature themes such as depression, suicide, murder and cancer, but also provides moments of humor.

The game was well received for its story and characters. It won "Best Story" in the 2012 Aggie Awards.

== Gameplay ==
The game is presented as a side-scroller with simple controls. The left and right arrow keys are used to move Susan, the up key (or Enter) near a character or highlighted object to interact with them, and the down key to open up the inventory. The Esc key can also be pressed to reveal a load/save system.

Susan's goal is often to either escape a given location or to break into one, which can be done by solving puzzles. The game includes an inventory system, where objects can be collected and later used.

The gameplay can change during certain sections. At one point, two "mental gauges" are added to track Susan's distress and comfort; once filled completely, Susan will either suffer a mental breakdown or go to sleep, respectively. Moreover, there is also a moment when the player can control a cat.

The player can occasionally make dialogue decisions that alter the story, including its ending.

== Plot ==
Susan Ashworth is a chronically depressed 40-year-old woman who lives alone in a dilapidated council flat in England. Her only companions are the neighborhood stray cats, whom she summons to her flat by playing the piano. She is derisively known among the tenants in her building as "the cat lady".

At the start of the game, Susan commits suicide by an overdose of sleeping pills, awakening in a strange afterlife where she encounters a mysterious elderly woman who refers to herself as "The Queen of Maggots" and claims to understand Susan's distress. Promising to help Susan reclaim her happiness, the Queen of Maggots returns her to the world of the living, now granted immortality and the task of ridding the world of five psychopaths referred to as the "Parasites".

Susan awakens in reality in a hospital bed, uncertain if what she had experienced was a dream. Prior to her release, Susan meets with the hospital's psychiatrist Dr. Xavier Zellman, to whom she opens up about her depression and family history (much of which is decided by the player). Following their session, Dr. Zellman stabs Susan to death. She is resurrected in an abandoned basement wing of the hospital, where she discovers that he is secretly a sadistic serial killer who kills his patients and uses their corpses to recreate pieces of classical artwork. Realizing her encounter with The Queen of Maggots was real, Susan solves puzzles to escape the torture dungeon and, depending on which route the player takes, kills Dr. Zellman.

Returning to her flat, Susan attempts to adjust to a normal life again, but struggles to control the symptoms of her illness and spirals into another depressive episode. The following day, she meets Mitzi Hunt, a young woman inquiring about a spare room for rent. While talking to Mitzi, Susan is startled by a vision of the Queen of Maggots appearing behind her, prompting Mitzi to reveal that she has terminal cancer. As Susan helps Mitzi settle into the spare room, Mitzi reveals her true intentions, explaining that she had a boyfriend named Jack who was driven to despair by her diagnosis of glioblastoma, which gave her six months to live. Jack stumbled across an online suicide forum in which he encountered a user called "The Eye of Adam", a troll who coerces suicidal people into killing themselves. Under "The Eye of Adam"'s influence and instruction, Jack attempted to persuade Mitzi to enter a suicide pact, though when Mitzi refused, Jack took his own life instead. Though unaware of his true identity, Mitzi tracked "The Eye of Adam"'s location to Susan's building, insisting that she wishes to talk with him before she dies.

That night, Susan encounters a pair of parasites, a pest exterminator and his wife, who kidnap Susan and hold her captive in their house, which is littered with human remains. Susan eventually manages to escape and kill both of them, making her way back home to a worried Mitzi, whom she hugs. The two women gradually become friends, with Mitzi even helping create a social media account for Susan. As they begin to map out their building to determine where "The Eye of Adam" is located, Susan is accosted by another parasite, an unnamed assailant who breaks into their apartment and ties up both of them in the bathroom. Trapped together, Susan fully opens up to Mitzi about her past, revealing that she was once married with an infant daughter who accidentally died from a pollen allergy due to being exposed to a bouquet of flowers left near her crib. Shortly after, Susan's husband was found dead from alcohol poisoning in nearby woods, leaving Susan alone. When the parasite releases the two women from captivity, he commands Susan to play the piano, which summons the stray cats who promptly attack, kill and eat him.

The next day, Susan and Mitzi exhaustively explore the apartment building though find no leads on "The Eye of Adam"'s location. However, as they return to Susan's apartment, they discover a note from "The Eye of Adam", asking them to meet at midnight in the flat of what appeared to be an elderly man living alone. The man explains that he is Adam's father; unable to cope with the things his son has done, he gives Susan a gas mask, upon which an unseen Adam triggers the release of poisonous gas in the flat. The man dies, though the player can make a choice whether to save Mitzi or Susan. If Susan dies, she has one final encounter with the Queen of Maggots in the afterlife, where she discovers that the Queen is a human representation of Susan's depression. The player can choose to either follow The Queen's final instructions or stand up to her. Either choice still leads to Susan being resurrected in Adam's flat.

Susan and Mitzi - or Susan alone, if the player doesn't save Mitzi - encounter "The Eye of Adam" in his room, where he's revealed to be a quadriplegic who communicates through a device controlled by his left eye, hence the literal "Eye of Adam". If Mitzi is there, she will pull a gun on Adam and vow to kill him for what he did to Jack. Adam will pressure Mitzi (or Susan) to "do it", knowing that the gunshot will ignite his tanks of oxygen and kill them all. The player is presented with the option of killing or sparing Adam, resulting in different endings.

In the game's canonical ending, Mitzi puts down her gun and lets Adam live. Months later, she dies of cancer. Susan is left alone and still depressed, but with a newfound desire to keep on living thanks to her friend.

== Cast ==
- Lynsey Frost as Susan Ashworth – a middle-aged widowed cat lady who developed depression following the deaths of her infant daughter and husband, but slowly comes around to dealing with her past over the course of the game. Frost would reprise her role for appearances in both the remake of Downfall and in a cameo in the game’s sequel, Lorelai.
- Brittany Morgan Williams as Mitzi Hunt – an energetic, tech-savvy, and terminally ill young woman who moves in with Susan in her quest for revenge against the online troll responsible for taking her boyfriend's life.
- Klemens Koehring as Doctor X / Eric Ashworth – Doctor X is the resident hospital psychiatrist who is also a serial killer targeting women to be reformed as his "artwork". Eric Ashworth is Susan's late husband who died from alcohol poisoning shortly after their daughter's death.
- David Firth as Pest Controller / His Wife – a cannibal couple who regularly kidnap women and eat their bodies.
- Jesse Gunn as Joe Davis, Susan's schizophrenic neighbor who tortures his wife in secret and acts as the protagonist of the developer’s previous game, Downfall.
- Pete Bucknall as Bryan, Susan's hostile and unsympathetic neighbor.
- Margaret Cowen as Queen of Maggots – an entity Susan sees after her suicide attempt, representing Susan's self-loathing but also a chance at recovery. The Queen acts as the series’ main antagonist, with Cowen voicing all appearances.
- Alex Sinclair as Doctor
- Dave Seaman as Jesse
- Marin Miller as Nurse
- Mark Lovegrove as Police Phone Operator
- Remigiusz Michalski as Crow / Ivy Davis

== Development ==
Remigiusz Michalski (also known as Rem) is a Polish game developer, who lived a portion of his life in England. He revealed in an interview that the game's dark atmosphere was inspired by his connections to other people, not by personal experiences with depression. Rem also noted his work as a male nurse, which helped him understand different kinds of mental suffering and write female characters more realistically. He mentioned his intentions while crafting the game were to tackle depression and transmit the message that "no matter what cards life deals us, there is always a way out, and it’s not suicide".

The game was made with the Adventure Game Studio engine, as was his previous game Downfall. Unlike Downfall, however, which made use of point-and-click mechanics, The Cat Lady employed keyboard controls. The change, according to the developer, was motivated by a desire to make the game "a bit more exciting". Another difference was the addition of voice acting, which Rem expressed delight about, mentioning specifically Jesse Gunn as Joe Davis and Lynsey Frost as Susan Ashworth.

The creator described Susan Ashworth as "just a person next door", highlighting how she symbolizes the kind of people who are often ignored by others and live in solitude. He disclosed she was inspired by a real person he is close to. When asked about Susan's relationship with Mitzi, Rem called it "friendship in pure form" and remarked Mitzi's presence helped Susan come to terms with her grief over her daughter Zoe.

Rem revealed he "didn’t really know" who the Queen of Maggots was while writing the first chapter, since his writing style involves connecting the dots instead of planning everything beforehand. Her reveal as a personification of Susan's mental illness, he mentions, "just made sense".

== Reception ==
Reception

Aggregate score
Aggregator	Score
Metacritic	81/100

Review scores
Publication	Score
Adventure Gamers	4.5/5
GameSpot	8/10

The Cat Lady received generally favorable reviews. It received an aggregated score of 81/100 based on 11 reviews on Metacritic. Kevin VanOrd of GameSpot gave the game a very positive review, and concluded it by saying, "If you seek horror, The Cat Lady may sometimes freak you out, though probably not outright scare you. But that horror is in service of a touching character portrait—a portrait that's authentically, poignantly askew." The game won "Best Story" in the 2012 Aggie Awards.

Merlina McGovern, from Adventure Gamers, described having difficulty discerning reality from fantasy while playing The Cat Lady. She praised the game's writing, music, voice acting, organic puzzles and use of colors as means of establishing the atmosphere. At the same time, McGovern acknowledged the gore could be excessive and alienate players. She also criticized how sometimes the game would imply a certain dialogue option would produce new lines, only for the same text to appear again.
