= Lawyers' Christian Fellowship =

UK evangelical organisation

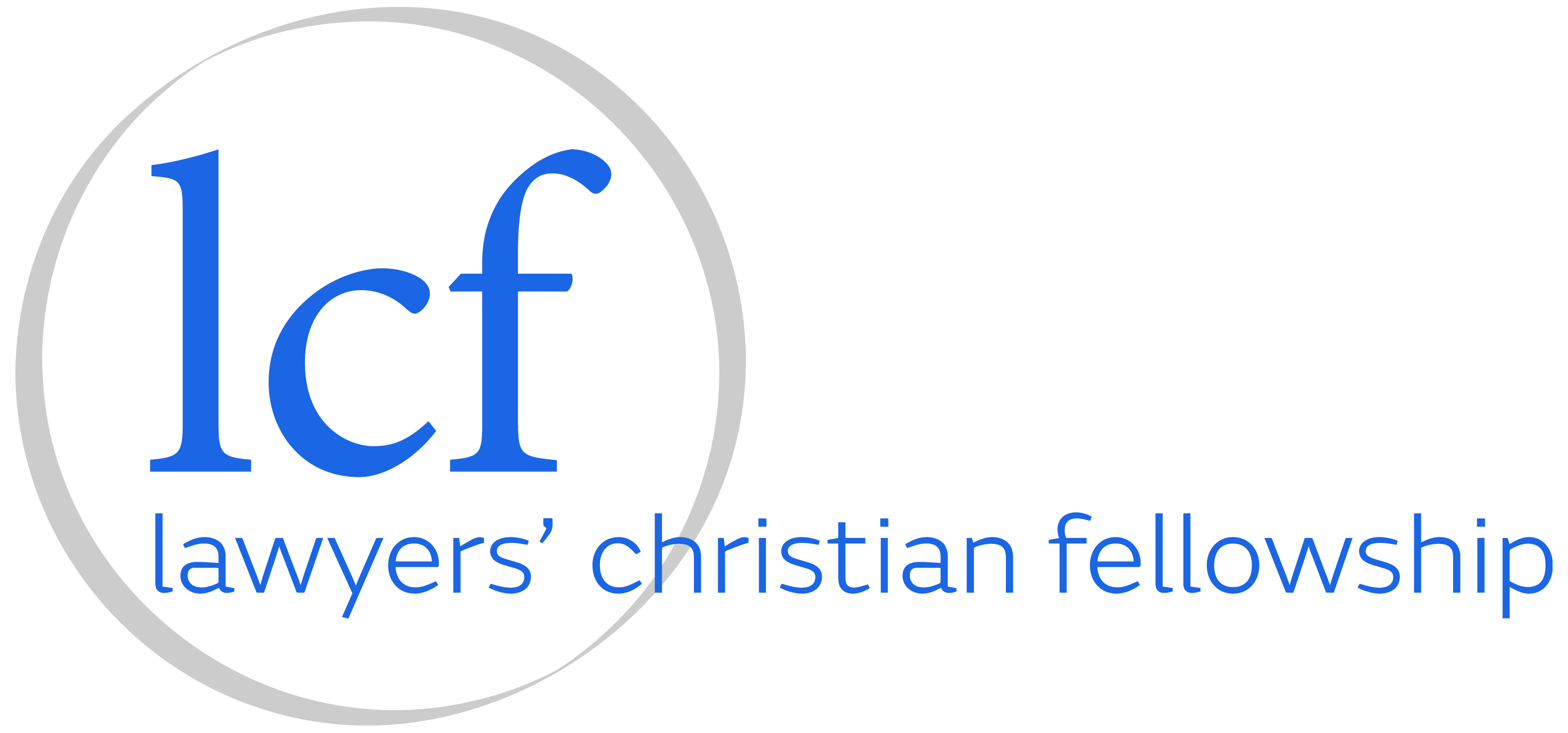
- Abbreviation: LCF
- Formation: 1852; 174 years ago
- Type: Evangelical legal network
- Headquarters: London, England
- Region served: United Kingdom
- Chair: Mark Jones
- Executive director: Mark Bainbridge
- Website: lawcf.org

The Lawyers' Christian Fellowship is an evangelical organisation in the United Kingdom which professes a membership of more than 2,000 Christian lawyers. The organisation's website states that its vision is to "bring the whole good news of Jesus Christ within the legal world".

== History ==
The Lawyers' Christian Fellowship was founded in 1852 as the Lawyers' Prayer Union, and was subsequently renamed Lawyers' Christian Fellowship. The LCF states on its website that it has a long history of uniting and equipping Christian lawyers and witnessing to members of the legal profession. The LCF claims that in its 150 years of activity it has impacted both individual lives and the wider legal landscape through its commitment to the Bible's teaching. Since its inception as a prayer union, the scope of LCF's work has grown with the support of such patrons as Lord Denning and Lord Mackay of Clashfern.

== Current activity ==
Work of the LCF has developed into three main areas: the legal workplace, amongst law students and young lawyers and internationally.

Local workplace groups meet across the UK to study, pray and encourage evangelism.

The LCF has particularly strong international links in East Africa.

== Vision ==
According to the LCF website, its members aim "to act justly and to love mercy and to walk humbly with your God" (Micah 6:8). The LCF website states that the LCF's vision is encouraging its members to:

- Speak the good news: from within the legal profession.
- Live the good news: living as godly lawyers.
- Apply the good news: applying God's justice on the ground.
- Promote the good news: working for good laws.

The LCF also believes in enabling its members through information, teaching, and support to fulfill their full potential as lawyers for Christ. They believe in witnessing to the legal profession by speaking of the Christian gospel and demonstrating God's character of justice and compassion by upholding Christian values in the administration of law at home and overseas.

== Notable media coverage ==
In May 2008, the British current affairs programme, Dispatches, presented a feature entitled In God's Name. The programme explored the growing influence of the Christian evangelical movement in the UK and highlighted LCF's involvement in lobbying the UK government on issues such as abortion, gay rights and laws relating to blasphemy. The activities of the then LCF Director of Public Policy, Andrea Williams, were examined, including footage of her meetings with Conservative politicians Norman Tebbit and Nadine Dorries. Williams was reported as making a number of controversial statements, including claims that the Human Fertilisation bill was "the work of the devil", that abortion should be illegal, homosexuality is sinful and the world is just 4,000 years old. Williams no longer works for LCF and is presently employed by Christian Concern.

== See also ==
- Christian Voice (UK)
- Philemon Ministries
