= Gay Police Association =

The Gay Police Association (GPA) was a British police staff association representing gay and bisexual police officers and staff across the United Kingdom's 52 police forces. Founded in 1990 as LAGPA (Lesbian and Gay Police Association), it adopted its current name in 2001. The GPA campaigned for equal treatment of LGBT officers within UK policing and gained public attention in 2006 over a controversial advertising campaign that drew a record number of complaints to the Advertising Standards Authority. Following a decline in activity and a funding cut linked to government austerity measures, the national GPA voted to dissolve in 2014, with its role largely taken over by the National LGBT+ Police Network in 2015. A separate branch in Scotland continued independently and was reformed as the Scottish LGBTI Police Association in 2016.

== Aims and Achievements of the Gay Police Association ==
The GPA's objectives were to:

- Promote equal opportunities for gay and bisexual men and women in the police service
- Offer advice and support to gay and bisexual men and women in the police service and
- Improve relations between the police service and the wider gay community.

One of GPA's achievements was persuading, in 2003, most Chief Constables to allow gay Police Officers to march in uniform in 'Gay Pride' marches. Traditionally, Police Officers have not been permitted to wear uniform on marches or demonstrations that might be controversial or in any way 'political', but most Chief Constables agreed that Pride was a legitimate celebration of LGBT life and culture and by participating in uniform, could demonstrate the diversity within modern day Police Forces. Gay policemen and women first marched in full uniform in the London Gay Pride March on 26 July 2003. At the time, the GPA issued the following press release: "The Gay Police Association, a staff association recognised by the Metropolitan Police Service, sought permission for officers to attend the Gay Pride march in uniform. It was decided that it would be acceptable for officers to do so, subject to some safeguards. The safeguards relate mainly to risks that may arise by having off duty officers in uniform at an event policed by officers wearing uniform. The safeguards deal with these risks". Now the police are joined by the other emergency services and members of the Armed Forces, in uniform.

== 2006 advertisement controversy ==
In 2006, an advert by the Gay Police Association in The Independent attracted a record number of complaints, mainly from Christians and Christian organisations many of whom organised a campaign against the advert and urged people to complain to the Advertising Standards Authority (ASA). The GPA agreed to withdraw the advert as a result of the findings of the ASA. The GPA advert showed a Bible lying next to a pool of blood, accompanied by the following text: "In the last 12 months, the Gay Police Association has recorded a 74% increase in homophobic incidents, where the sole or primary motivating factor was the religious belief of the perpetrator". Over 500 separate complaints about the advert were made, the highest number for any advert that year.

The ASA upheld three classes of complaints. First, the advert was considered to be "likely to cause offence to those readers who were Christian" and breached Clause 5.1 of the Code of Advertising Practice. Second, the advert, "by featuring spilled blood prominently, wrongly suggested that all the reported incidents involved physical injury" and breached Clause 7.1 of the Code. Third, the GPA was unable to substantiate the claims made in the advert – a further breach of the Code, this time of Clause 3.1. The ASA did not uphold the complaint that the advert implied that the Bible condoned anti-homosexual attacks or that the advert incited violence towards 'people of faith', especially Christians.

The ASA's actions included "telling the GPA to ensure future campaigns were not presented in a way that could cause undue offence, reminding them that they should ensure the use of imagery did not send misleading messages to consumers, and asking them to ensure any statistics could be substantiated".

A statement from the GPA said that "The GPA never refused to supply any material, we made it clear to the ASA that as there was a criminal investigation underway so we could not supply the material." The ASA refused to allow more time for the GPA to supply requested material.

The Gay Police Association advert led to what the BBC described as a 'bitter row' between the Gay Police Association and the Christian Police Association.

A number of Christians attempted to have the GPA prosecuted using the rarely used common law offence of blasphemy. An attempt by Rev George Hargreaves to prosecute the GPA using public order legislation failed, as did an attempt to hold individual members of the GPA Executive Committee personally liable, using police discipline regulations. At the time, some critics accused the Christians who made these prosecution attempts of hypocrisy, as vocal Christians – such as Stephen Green of Christian Voice – have been quoted in defence of freedom of speech/expression on other occasions.

The Gay Police Association's view is that verbal abuse and physical assault against gay men and women constitute criminal offences and should be reported to the police. Discrimination against gay people in the workplace is also unlawful and the GPA say all such discrimination should be reported to employers, who have a legal duty of care to prevent it.

== Matthew Windibank Award ==
After one of the LAGPA founding (civilian) members Matthew Windibank died by suicide in March 1999, an award was commissioned in his name. The award recognises individuals and organisations that have made an outstanding contribution to the progression of LGBT equality issues inside and outside the police service. Matthew Windibank committed suicide by lethal injection of insulin in a Brighton hotel after a long-standing relationship broke down. He was never a Police Officer; he was employed by the police as full-time civilian race relations adviser.

- 2001, National Advisory Group (NAG), for Policing Lesbian & Gay Communities
- 2002, Paul Kelly, Chairman, Greater Manchester Police Federation Joint Branch Board
- 2003, Simon Taylor, Assistant Chief Constable, Norfolk Constabulary
- 2004, Dave McFarlane, National Coordinator of the National Black Police Association
- 2005, Peter Tatchell, OutRage!
- 2006, Paddy Tomkins, Chief Constable, Lothian and Borders Police
- 2007, Richard Kirker, general secretary of the Lesbian and Gay Christian Movement.
