= Halewood Academy =

Location
- The Avenue, Wood Road; Liverpool, Merseyside, L26 1UU; England; 53°21′44″N 2°50′29″W

Information
- Type: Academy
- Motto: "We Seek The Best"
- Trust: Wade Deacon Trust
- Department for Education URN: 139614 Tables
- Ofsted: Reports
- Principal: Ian Critchley
- Gender: Coeducational
- Age: 11 to 16
- Enrolment: 1035
- Colour: Black Blue
- Website: www.halewoodacademy.co.uk

Halewood Academy is a secondary school in Halewood, Merseyside, United Kingdom, with over 1,100 students. As of October 2026, the principal is Mr Ian Critchley.

== History ==
The school was built under the private finance initiative and opened in 2009 as Halewood Centre for Learning, but became an Academy in May 2013.

In April 2015, Ofsted placed the academy in "special measures" following an 'Inadequate' inspection report, though a later inspection in April 2017 overall graded it as 'Good'. The Academy closed its sixth form in August 2017. In 2017 Halewood Academy joined The Wade Deacon Trust. In May 2022 an Ofsted inspection confirmed the school continued to be ‘Good’

== Alumni ==
Alumni of the school include Nadine Dorries.
