= Philemon Ministries =

Non-profitable organization based in Kenya

- Formation: 2009
- Type: Christian prison ministry
- Headquarters: Nairobi, Kenya
- Founder: Kelvin Mwikya
- Key people: Martin and Reuben, Chair Philemon UK
- Website: philemonministries.org

Philemon Ministries is a charitable foundation started by Kelvin Mwikya in Nairobi, Kenya, in 2009. The charity provides food, shelter, counselling, community, training and employment to prisoners and former prisoners. The charity is supported by the Office of the Vice-President of Kenya and Lord Goldsmith.

The charity's name comes from the Epistle to Philemon in the Bible, in which the apostle Paul mediated the relationship between the changed prisoner Onesimus and his former master Philemon.

== Mission ==
Philemon focuses on the rehabilitation, reintegration of young offenders and prison evangelism and discipleship in Kenya. The organizations provides food, shelter, counselling, education sponsorship and vocational skill training, with the ultimate goal of reintegration into society.

== Organizational history ==
In 2009, Philemon was officially founded by Mwikya as a Kenyan charity. His first action was to address the very basic needs of prisoners, through the provision of toilet paper, soap, food and clothing. As Philemon grew, Mwikya started more ambitious interventions, such as business skills classes with participants learning skills such as financial management, stock-keeping and costing.

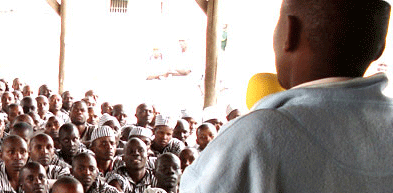
Kelvin Mwikya in action

Philemon established the first half-way home in Kenya, accommodating residents on a six-month program. As of January 2011, approximately 150 released prisoners have passed through the halfway house. Residents learn skills such as carpentry, metalwork and tailoring in the social enterprise businesses of Philemon. Philemon assists residents to go on and find employment, for example, by helping residents to obtain ID cards.

Mwikya's work got noticed, both by local churches who wanted to help and by government officials, who asked him to help them address the inherent failures of the system.

== Activities ==
Philemon works with Government and civil society groups, local churches and international partners. Its current activities include:

- Visiting prisons to proclaim the gospel and provide for basic material need
- Providing community for former prisoners in our halfway home and through local peer support networks
- Teaching key life and employment skills, nurturing character, encouraging repentance and change, discipling and mentoring
- Supporting former prisoners in the process of reconciliation with their families, establishing sustainable livelihoods for themselves and becoming servant-leaders of their communities
- Engaging in policy dialogue and reform of the criminal justice and prison systems

The prisons work of Philemon includes Bible distribution, prison fellowship groups, open air meetings and welfare support. Five prison life groups meet every Saturday in five prisons in four provinces, and the groups work through a variety of Bible studies on topics dealing with everyday issues. The aim of the life groups is to prepare prisoners for release through support and family reconciliation, and to offer guidance on challenges faced upon release, including employment, housing and stigma.

== Partnership and supporters ==
Mwikya has a number of high-profile supporters, including Kenyan Director of Probation, Jeremy Oloo; Commissioner of Prisons, Isaiah Osugo; and former Kenyan Vice-President Kalonzo Musyoka.

Former UK Attorney General Lord Goldsmith also visited the Philemon halfway house on 21 November 2006. Mwikya's story is reported as having made a strong impression on Lord Goldsmith and he commented that it was a very humbling testimony to hear.

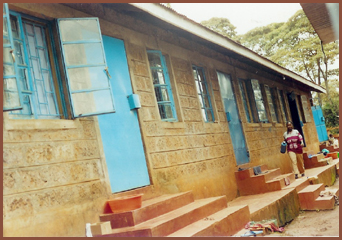
Philemon halfway house in Kenya

Kerioko Tabiko, Director of Public Prosecution, from the office of the Attorney General Office, stated on 17 November 2006 that "Kelvin is an inspiration to thousands of people in and out of prison, and its up to us to utilize his experience to benefit [the prison reform] process."

Philemon in Kenya has a long-standing partnership with Philemon UK, which supports, encourages, and raises awareness and finances for Philemon in Kenya. Mwikya is also developing links with Philemon in Canada.

Philemon partners with Christian lawyers in Kenya, CLEAR Kenya, as well as The Lawyers' Christian Fellowship in the UK, with LCF teams coming from the UK to support, among other projects, the work of Philemon. The role of Philemon and Mwikya was important in establishing the international work of LCF and the prisons work of CLEAR Kenya.

Mwikya is also a member of the Tearfund programme for Inspired Individuals, which seeks to identify support and resources with a vision to transform the lives of millions living in poverty.

== Media coverage ==
On 15 October 2010, the work of Philemon was highlighted in a lead feature article in the Saturday Daily Nation, the largest and most influential newspaper in Kenya and East Africa.

K24TV, a Kenyan television station, covered the work of Mwikya and Philemon in an in-depth documentary.

Kenyan Citizen TV, another Kenyan television station, has also highlighted the work of Mwikya and Philemon in its documentary, "Hope for Ex-convicts".
