= Sam Solomon =

Pseudonym of a British former Muslim author

Sam Solomon was the Christian pseudonym of a British former Muslim author who specialised in Islam and Sharia law. Born in Egypt in 1954, he was a Christian convert, known for "A Proposed Charter of Muslim Understanding", as well as the Al Hijra-theory of Muslim immigration. He died on October 1, 2025.

== Biography ==
According to his own account, Solomon was an imam in Khartoum who was "born and raised as a Muslim, had trained in Sharia law for 15 years before converting to Christianity. He was imprisoned and questioned; and was to be put to death, whereupon he chose to go to exile on the pain of death." He has testified before the US congress and has been a consultant to the British parliament for matters regarding Islam, and was a co-founder of Christian Concern.

=== Writings ===
In 2006, following the 7 July 2005 London bombings, Solomon was commissioned by UK Independence Party MEP Gerard Batten to author "A Proposed Charter of Muslim Understanding", which among other things proposes for British Muslims to sign a declaration against promotions of violent jihad in the Quran. Although at first supported by the party, the charter later proved controversial, and UKIP leader Nigel Farage in 2014 distanced the party from it after Batten continued to call for Muslims to sign it, and again after the Charlie Hebdo shooting.

Solomon, with Elias Al-Maqdisi, is also known for the Al Hijra-theory, published in the book Modern Day Trojan Horse: The Islamic Doctrine of Immigration, which claims, based on the hijra (migration) of Muslim Prophet Muhammad, that the modern-day immigration of Muslims is a deliberate strategy of Islamisation.

"Hijra or migration is binding on all Muslims for numerous reasons; the most important being that migration is preparatory to jihad with an aim and objective of securing victory for Islam." (Solomon, Al-Maqdisi, 2009)

They also assert that taqiyya (deception) is a key strategy in the Islamisation of the UK. Together with Atif Debs, another former Muslim, Solomon has written the book Not the Same God: Is the Qur'an Allah the LORD God of the Bible?, which argues, drawing on Quranic scholarship, that the Muslim Allah and God of Christianity are not the same.

Solomon and Al-Maqdisi's book Al-Yahud: Eternal Islamic Enmity and the Jews was banned in Malaysia in 2017.

=== Other activities ===
Solomon was a co-founder of and the Islamic Affairs Adviser to Christian Concern, and in 2004 worked with the group against the Religious Hatred Bill. In 2007 he participated in the international counter-jihad conference in Brussels, and later played an important role in the counter-jihad movement. He attended the International Legal Conference on Freedom of Speech and Religion together with among others Pamela Geller and Robert Spencer in 2009, and was invited to speak in the Israeli Knesset by MK Aryeh Eldad the same year. In 2011 he spoke at the Geert Wilders "A Warning to America" event at Cornerstone Church in Nashville. He has also been on the advisory board of the International Free Press Society.

In 2023, it was revealed by Hope not Hate that Solomon had been one of the individuals active in the New Issues Group, a secret group of anti-Muslim activists that had operated out of the House of Lords for over a decade, hosted by Lord Pearson and Baroness Cox. It was also noted that he had written for the former Sharia Watch UK website of another group member, Anne Marie Waters.

== Works ==
- Solomon, S.; Alamaqdisi, E. (2007). The Mosque Exposed. Publishers Solution. ISBN 978-0979492907.
- Solomon, Sam; Al Maqdisi, E. (2009). Modern Day Trojan Horse: Al-Hijra, the Islamic Doctrine of Immigration, Accepting Freedom or Imposing Islam?. Publishers Solution. ISBN 978-0979492952.
- Solomon, Sam; Al Maqdisi, E. (2009). A Common Word: The Undermining of the Church. Publishers Solution. ISBN 978-0979492921.
- Solomon, Sam; Al-Maqdisi, Elias (2010). Al-Yahud: Eternal Islamic Enmity and the Jews. Publishers Solution. ISBN 978-0971534636.
- Solomon, Sam; Debs, Atif (2015). Not the Same God: Is the Qur'an Allah the LORD God of the Bible?. Publishers Solution. ISBN 978-0990837220.
