= Christian Concern =

UK advocacy group

- Formation: 2004 (as part of Lawyers' Christian Fellowship)
- Type: Conservative Evangelical advocacy group
- Headquarters: 70 Wimpole Street, London
- Region served: United Kingdom
- Chief Executive: Andrea Minichiello Williams
- Website: www.christianconcern.com
- Formerly called: Christian Concern For Our Nation

Christian Concern is the trading name of CCFON Ltd, a not for profit advocacy group. It has been described as "one of the most prominent evangelical organisations in the United Kingdom", reaching a mailing list of more than 43,000 people. Christian Concern seeks to alter law and influence the media and government, and is linked to the Christian Legal Centre organisation.

== History ==
The organisation was co-founded by the barrister and evangelical activist Andrea Minichiello Williams; Before 2008, it functioned as a network run from the Lawyers' Christian Fellowship (LCF) Public Policy Unit, which was then headed by Williams. An internet domain was registered to the organisation using the name Christian Concern For Our Nation (CCFON). In 2006, CCFON described itself as "an activity of the Lawyers' Christian Fellowship Public Policy Unit", functioning as a "service for non-lawyers who want to be equipped to understand, act and respond to the increasing number of legal issues impacting the Gospel and Biblical justice at the heart of our society". CCFON described itself as "[consisting] of a website and e-mail update service supported by an active team of lawyers".

The organisation separated from the LCF in June 2008, with Williams stating that this was to avoid jeopardising the charitable status of the LCF, as political activity from a charity, when it's a stated purpose of that charity, is illegal under UK law. CCFON Ltd was incorporated as an independent body on 24 June 2008. In October 2010, CCFON Ltd shortened its operating name to Christian Concern.

Williams is currently chief executive of Christian Concern and also acts as the founder and operating director of Christian Legal Centre, a sister organisation that describes itself as serving to "defend Christians in the public sphere and to protect the freedom of Christians to live their lives in accordance with their Christian beliefs". Until his death in 2025, Sam Solomon acted as a consultant for Christian Concern, advising on Islamic affairs.

The organisation is currently based in the City of Westminster.

== Ideology and issues ==
The organisation is known for its views on and opposition to trends of liberalisation within Christianity in the United Kingdom, and trends of liberalisation within wider society. It views society as having "largely turned [its] back on Jesus", leading to the growth of ideas such as "secular liberal humanism, moral relativism and sexual licence", which has led to "widespread family breakdown, immorality and social disintegration". The organisation views the "fruit" of ideas that are alternative to Christianity as "rotten", and seeks to combat them through engaging politically with a broad range of issues, including (but not limited to) abortion, adoption and fostering, Islam, marriage and issues relating to sexual orientation.

The organisation also takes opposition to liberalising trends in specific denominations, such as the Church of England; in 2014, the Church of England responded to a government survey on civil partnerships in support, with Christian Concern's Andrea Williams opposed to the church's decision. In 2018, Christian Concern criticised the Anglican church for supporting civil partnerships; arguing against civil unions, Christian Concern stated that "Legal recognition of same-sex relationships should not have been given in the first place and should not be allowed for priests in any case. The government should not listen to the alarmed voice of the [Church of England] in this case." When it was revealed that the Church of England appointed Nicholas Chamberlain as the Bishop of Grantham, knowing that he was in a same sex relationship, Christian Concern stated that it opposed the appointment. Christian Concern also opposed the church's decision to affirm transgender members.

=== Notable campaigns ===
In 2005 and early 2006, the group campaigned, alongside other Christian organisations, to stop the passing of the Religious Hatred Bill. The Bill was later passed with amendments in the House of Lords.

In 2006 and 2007, the organisation opposed segments of the Equality Act Sexual Orientation Regulations, organising a rally outside Parliament and a petition which gained over 10,000 signatures, on the grounds that they claimed the new law would "discriminate heavily" against Christians. From Autumn 2007, they campaigned against some clauses in the Human Fertilisation and Embryology Bill, organising a demonstration outside Parliament in January 2008. Both Bills subsequently passed reading in the House of Commons without amendment.

In 2007, the organisation supported Lydia Playfoot, a schoolgirl who had been instructed to remove a sexual abstinence ring in school because it contravened her school's uniform policy. Miss Playfoot took her case to the High Court of Justice, alleging that her human rights had been violated under the European Convention on Human Rights. The High Court found against her, awarding her school £12,000 costs. Also in 2007, the organisation supported foster parents who had refused to sign a new contract drawn up to implement the Sexual Orientation Regulations.

The organisation launched its 'Not Ashamed' campaign in December 2010, aimed at encouraging Christians to live out their faith in public, drawing attention to instances where Christians believed themselves to have been marginalised at work or in public life. The campaign was backed by George Carey, and secured wide media coverage on its official launch in December 2010. Another Christian think tank, Ekklesia, said that there was "no evidence" of systematic discrimination as the organisation claimed.

In 2021, Christian Concern and the Christian Legal Centre supported Seyi Omooba in her legal case against the Curve Theatre in Leicester and her former agency (Global Artists), where she alleged religious discrimination, harassment and breach of contract. The case was dismissed. Briefly, Omooba accepted the part of Celie in the Curve's production of The Colour Purple, a part that includes portrayal of a lesbian relationship in the original book and dramatisations of it. Problems arose when homophobic posts by Omooba from 2014 threatened boycott of the production. Many inconsistencies in Omooba's case include that she was unaware that the directors expected Celie to be played as a lesbian, despite that being a central element of the narrative and that Omooba had appeared in the 2017 Cadogan Hall British Theatre Academy production of The Colour Purple (not as Celie, but as Nettie - a part for which she received high praise). Further to this, she had read the script before accepting the part. In February 2021, when the case was dismissed, with costs awarded to the Curve Theatre, Seyi Omooba was said to be considering an appeal against the judgement. Omooba appealed her case to the High Court of Justice, but in March 2024, the Court ruled against her appeal. Omooba's lawyers stated that they would appeal her case to the Court of Appeal.

== 2008 Channel 4 documentary ==
The Channel 4 Dispatches documentary "In God's Name", which first aired on 19 May 2008, examined the growing influence of Christian evangelical movements in the UK. Investigative journalist David Modell followed head of Christian Concern, Williams, who, at the time, was public policy director of the Lawyers' Christian Fellowship. The documentary featured Williams and documented her lobbying the British Government on issues such as abortion, gay rights and the enforcing of laws relating to blasphemy. The programme included footage of Williams' meetings with Conservative politicians Norman Tebbit and Nadine Dorries, both of whom have worked with the Lawyers' Christian Fellowship to influence policy on matters where they had a common agenda. When director David Modell asked Williams if she believes Islam is the 'work of the devil' Williams replied "I believe that Islam is a false religion yes." In the documentary, Williams addresses the LCF's track record of losing cases by saying "it's vital that these issues are aired and won in the court room." David Modell concludes that, "perhaps one of the problems is that she relies on evidence that has no apparent basis in reality." Williams also discussed her involvement in the Andrew McClintock case - a magistrate who opposed gay adoption cases and who received support from Lawyers' Christian Fellowship. Williams stated:

it's not about the oppression of the homosexual community but the evidence shows that children raised in those households are more likely to be gender confused, more likely to be drug dependent, more likely to not finish school.

Modell concluded that Williams was "a colourful and powerful campaigner for the implementation of radical Christian views" and that she "believes any law that goes against her strict biblical beliefs must be fought". The programme includes footage of Williams stating that the Human Fertilisation Bill was "the work of the devil", that homosexuality is sinful, that abortion should be illegal, and that the world is just 4,000 years old.

=== Working relationship with Nadine Dorries ===
Christian Concern's director Andrea Williams has a closely working relationship with British conservative politician Nadine Dorries. Williams was a team member of Dorries' campaign to reduce the upper limit on abortion to 20 weeks - a campaign that was partly funded by Christian Concern. Williams who wrote the anti-abortion amendments for Dorries. In the Channel 4 Dispatches documentary, "In God's Name", Dorries was asked how closely she worked with Williams and replied, ""Closely? We've been stuck to the hip. Very closely." In reference to her campaign, Dorries also said:

What goes on in here would have no structure whatsover, no sense of achievement if it wasn't for people like Andrea on the outside. You know, the Lawyers Christian Fellowship, the Medical Christian Fellowship on this particular issue are absolutely vital because they give us the information

In the same documentary, Dorries claimed she had not discussed Williams' views on Islam. Williams, who was sat next to her, proceeded to say "I believe that Islam is a false religion" and switched off her microphone.

== Reaction to Living in Love and Faith ==
Ben John of Christian Concern in his response to Living in Love and Faith, part of a number of resources encouraging more LGBT inclusion within the Church of England, argued against transgender rights, saying that "transgenderism is a false ideology". In response to comments from Alex Clare-Young (a non-binary minister of the United Reformed Church) and their wife, John said "what we're actually seeing here is a lesbian couple. This man isn't really a man. She's a woman. ... These were leaders in the church. Should we be ordaining transgender people?" He also criticised comments made by the Archbishop of Canterbury, Justin Welby, by saying "We have bishops openly promoting homosexual, practising relationships, transgenderism and yet we tolerate that. That is not love. It seems to me that Archbishop Justin is implying that there's all these different views, [that] we need to listen to one another and accept one another. But the reality is that some views should not be accepted or tolerated. There are some views that we need to condemn."

In response, Clare-Young asked John to re-edit his video and remove personal attacks, saying that the comments "were leading to personal harm to myself, my wife, and the others in the video. ... It describes me and my wife as being in a same-sex marriage, which isn't true." In response, Andrea Williams denied the comments were hateful, and said they upheld a "Biblical understanding of sex and gender." The police later investigated the comments as a potential hate crime.

== See also ==
- Christian Legal Centre
- Christian Voice (UK)
