= Parliamentary Under-Secretary of State for Women's Health and Maternity =

Junior minister in the government of the United Kingdom

United Kingdom Parliamentary Under-Secretary of State for Women's Health and Mental Health
- Royal Arms of His Majesty's Government

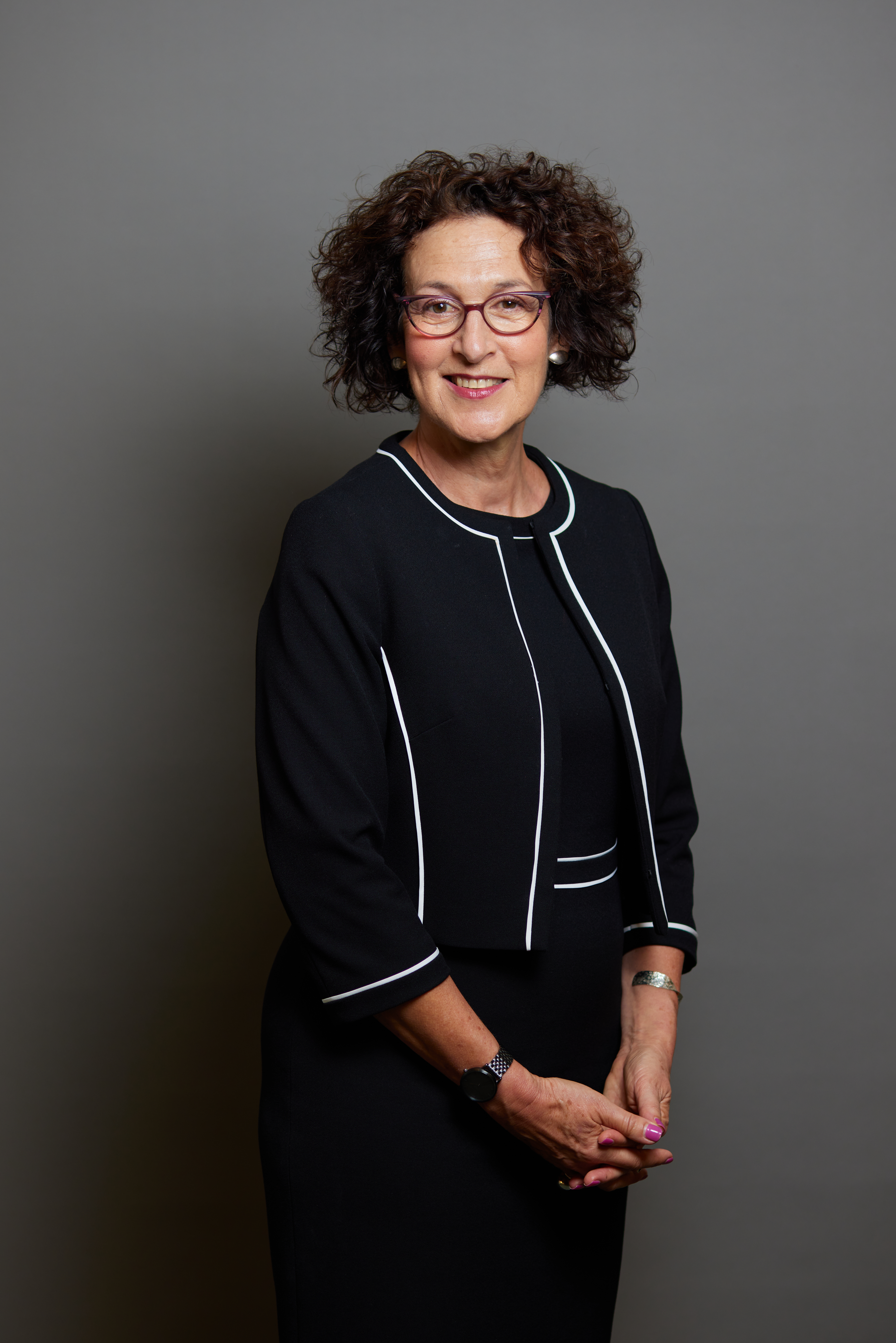
- Incumbent; Gillian Merron, Baroness Merron since 10 July 2024
- Department of Health and Social Care
- Nominator: Prime Minister
- Appointer: The Monarch on advice of the Prime Minister
- Term length: At His Majesty's pleasure
- Website: www.gov.uk/government/ministers/parliamentary-under-secretary-of-state--339

The Parliamentary Under-Secretary of State for Women's Health and Mental Health is a ministerial position within the Government of the United Kingdom, in charge of mental health and women's health policy.

== History ==
Following the general election in June 2017, Prime Minister Theresa May appointed Jackie Doyle-Price as the UK's first minister with responsibility for mental health. The portfolio was further expanded in October 2018, on World Mental Health Day, to include suicide prevention. This occurred while the UK government hosted the first ever global mental health summit.

In July 2019, Nadine Dorries was appointed to the position in the incoming Johnson ministry, with additional responsibility for patient safety. As minister, Dorries assumed responsibility for the government's response to the impact of the COVID-19 pandemic on people's mental health. The minister committed to an increase in government spending on mental health as a result of the lockdowns during the COVID-19 pandemic. In May 2020, the position was raised from Parliamentary Under-Secretary of State to Minister of State.

During the cabinet reshuffle in September 2021, Gillian Keegan was appointed Minister of State for Care and Mental Health, a position which combined with the mental health and social care portfolios. In June 2022, the department published the Draft Mental Health Bill, stating the government's intention to modernise the existing Mental Health Act 1983.

In September 2022, the incoming Truss ministry divided the mental health and care portfolios and appointed Caroline Johnson to the former, with responsibility for mental health and public health. Dr Johnson's tenure was unusually short, due to the collapse of the government in the following month. In October 2022, Maria Caulfield was appointed and given responsibility for mental health and women's health in the Sunak ministry.

== Responsibilities ==
The Parliamentary Under-Secretary of State for Mental Health and Women's Health Strategy leads on the following:

- women’s health
- maternity services
- gender identity services
- cosmetic regulation
- DHSC litigation
- mental health:
  - children and young people and early intervention
  - Mental Health Act
  - suicide prevention and crisis prevention
- bereavement
- disabilities, including autism
- offender health
- patient safety:
  - clinical negligence
  - historic inquiries
  - quality regulation
  - death certification
  - indemnity
  - Patient Safety Commissioner
- Vaccine Damage Payment Scheme
- patient experience:
  - ombudsman, complaints
  - whistleblowing, health ethics
- Government Equalities Office portfolio
- UK Health Security Agency (UKHSA):
  - COVID-19 – COVID-19 status certification, variant tracing, shielding
  - environmental health (air quality, chemicals, radiation)
  - health security at the border
  - infectious diseases (including monkeypox)
  - seasonal flu
- vaccines:
  - COVID-19 vaccine deployment and uptake
  - routine immunisations and vaccinations
- emergency preparedness including Ukraine
- sponsorship of:
  - Healthcare Safety Investigation Branch (HSIB)
  - Care Quality Commission (CQC)
  - NHS Resolution
  - Human Fertilisation and Embryology Authority (HFEA)
  - Human Tissue Authority (HTA)
  - UKHSA

== List of ministers ==
| Name | Portrait | Took office | Left office | Length of Term | Political party | Prime Minister |
Parliamentary Under-Secretary of State for Mental Health, Inequalities and Suicide Prevention (Note: Parliamentary Under-Secretary of State for Mental Health and Inequalities (2017–2018))
| Jackie Doyle-Price; MP for Thurrock | | 14 June 2017 | 27 July 2019 | 2 years, 43 days | Conservative | Theresa May |
Minister of State for Patient Safety, Suicide Prevention and Mental Health (Note: Parliamentary Under-Secretary of State for Patient Safety, Suicide Prevention and Mental Health (2019–2020))
| Nadine Dorries; MP for Mid Bedfordshire | | 27 July 2019 | 15 September 2021 | 2 years, 50 days | Conservative | Boris Johnson |
Minister of State for Care and Mental Health
| Gillian Keegan; MP for Chichester | | 16 September 2021 | 8 September 2022 | 357 days | Conservative | Boris Johnson |
Parliamentary Under-Secretary of State for Mental Health and Public Health
| Caroline Johnson; MP for Sleaford and North Hykeham | | 8 September 2022 | 27 October 2022 | 49 days | Conservative | Liz Truss |
Parliamentary Under-Secretary of State for Mental Health and Women’s Health Strategy
| Maria Caulfield; MP for Lewes | | 27 October 2022 | 5 July 2024 | 1 year, 252 days | Conservative | Rishi Sunak |
| Gillian Merron, Baroness Merron | | 10 July 2024 | 20 July 2026 | 2 years, 10 days | Labour | Keir Starmer |
Parliamentary Under-Secretary of State for Women's Health and Maternity
| Gillian Merron, Baroness Merron | | 21 July 2026 | Incumbent | 48 days | Labour | Andy Burnham |

== See also ==
- Mental health minister
