= Downfall (Dorries book) =

2024 book by Nadine Dorries

Downfall: The Self-Destruction of the Conservative Party
- Author: Nadine Dorries
- Language: English
- Publisher: HarperCollins
- Publication date: 21 November 2024
- Pages: 320 pages
- ISBN: 978-0-00-873092-5

Downfall: The Self-Destruction of the Conservative Party is a 2024 book by Nadine Dorries.

HarperCollins acquired the publishing rights.
