= Downfall (2009 video game) =

- Original cover art
- Developer: Harvester Games
- Publishers: Original: Harvester Games; Remake: Screen 7
- Composer: Michal Michalski (micAmic)
- Series: Devil Came Through Here
- Engine: Adventure Game Studio
- Platform: Windows
- Release: Original: May 15, 2009; Remake: February 15, 2016
- Genre: Adventure
- Mode: Single-player

Downfall is a 2009 indie point-and-click horror adventure game developed by Harvester Games for Windows. It follows Joe Davis, who is searching for his wife at the Quiet Haven Hotel after her disappearance. To progress, the player must explore rooms, solve puzzles and make choices.

It was created by Remigiusz Michalski, with soundtrack contributions from his brother Michal Michalski.

The original game was generally well received, with praise for its music and background art. However, criticism was directed at the glitches and portions of the writing.

A remake was released in February 2016, featuring revised graphics, a new soundtrack, keyboard controls and voice acting. It is part of the Devil Came Through Here trilogy, alongside The Cat Lady and Lorelai.

== Gameplay ==
Downfall (2009) - Dining room

Downfall is a point-and-click game where the player controls the main character, Joe Davis. The gameplay loop involves exploring rooms, fetching objects and completing puzzles.

There is an inventory system, where collected items can be kept and used to solve certain puzzles by interacting with objects in the environment. At a certain point, a second character named Agnes can be controlled instead of Joe. The game also includes a boss fight with a life bar. Sometimes the player has to make choices by clicking on one of two panels, leading to one of five different endings.

== Plot ==
Joe Davis and his wife, Ivy, are having trouble in their marriage. The couple decides to leave London for a break, but they are caught in a storm while Ivy has a panic attack. The two arrive at Quiet Haven Hotel, where Joe plans to spend the night.

He tries to reason with Ivy, who is speaking incoherently. Suddenly, she disappears and the hotel becomes a "nightmare" version of itself. Joe has to search for and kill four manifestations of an entity in order to reach the other side of a mirror, where he hopes to find her.

== Themes ==
Downfall explores child abuse and eating disorders, as well as loss of love. Remigiusz Michalski described the game as "a tale of a man blinded by love, desperately trying to save someone against their own will". He also characterized the horror setting as a metaphor for real-life situations, and the Quiet Haven Hotel as Joe's attempt at symbolic escapism from his problems.

== Development and release ==
Downfall was the first commercially released game by Polish developer Remigiusz Michalski, using Adventure Game Studio, with large portions produced during night shifts at a nursing home in England. Michalski recounted getting inspiration from conversations with resident patients, including parts of the dialogue written for Ivy. He also mentioned some locations in the game were based on rooms from that building. Meanwhile, the town itself was derived from Sidmouth, in Devon, where the developer lived for over a year.

The low-resolution graphics, he said, were chosen because they were easier to make while working alone. Michalski revealed having redesigned Joe halfway through development because he disliked the character's original appearance. The developer rejected calling the game a "one-man project" since his brother, Michal Michalski, recorded the soundtrack. According to Remigiusz Michalski, Michal worked on the music while the brothers lived hundreds of miles apart, based on brief directions and trust. The result was quite different from his initial expectations, but was fitting for the game's atmosphere nonetheless.

It was released on May 15, 2009, as a Direct2Drive exclusive. On December 19, 2011, it was made available for download by Headup Games. By December 2014, during the development of Downfall's remake, the original was available to download as freeware.

== Reception ==
Reception

Review scores
Publication	Score
Just Adventure	Original: B
Adventure Corner	Original: 76% Remake: 79%

Adventure Gamers described Downfall's reception as "satisfactory, though not spectacular".

Ricardo Pautassi, from Just Adventure, was positive about the puzzles, which he called "well-crafted and logical", as well as the soundtrack and visuals, although noting the character sprites "do not blend very well with the backgrounds". He expressed mixed feelings about the game's writing, praising the emotional depth of the characters, while also noticing the presence of cliches and the number of loose ends in the story. Pautassi's main criticism focused on the sudden change from a dramatic opening, which he considered too short, to an atmosphere of horror and gore.

Adventure Corner's Martin Letzel considered the game's gruesome elements might be a positive or negative depending on the player. The reviewer was delighted by the game's creepy atmosphere, created with the help of the background art and soundtrack. At the same time, he was disappointed by Joe's characterization, pointing out how often the protagonist would take actions he would later regret without reflecting on them first. Letzel also criticized the lack of voice acting, the wooden animation and the glitches.

== Downfall (2016) ==
Downfall (2016) - Dining room

According to the creator, the success of The Cat Lady allowed him to leave England and return to his hometown in Poland, to become a full-time developer, as well as to bring Downfall to Steam. However, he was dissatisfied with the quality of the original game, and decided to make a remake using the experience he had gained since then. The developer also expressed a desire to integrate the new version into the Devil Came Through Here trilogy, as well as to connect its characters more closely with those of The Cat Lady.

The production of the remake, the creator mentioned, was responsible for putting the development of Lorelai on hold. However, he expressed a certain relief since the game was not progressing in the right direction.

Michalski's ambitions included amplifying the horror and removing a boss battle. Michalski also explained that, aside from preserving the basic story and some memorable lines, all dialogue was rewritten from scratch. The animator Stefano Collavini was brought in to handle the remake's animation.

The soundtrack was composed by micAmic (Michal Michalski), alongside guest artists Warmer, Myuu, Siah, iamqqqqqqq, Ben and Alfie and Black Casino And the Ghost. The project also included paintings from Anton Constantin Anastassov (also known as Victim of Reality).

On February 15, 2016, the new version of Downfall was released. It had improved graphics and animations, a new soundtrack, as well as voice acting (which the original lacked). The remake also changed the control system, replacing the original point-and-click controls with keyboard controls (similarly to the original game’s follow-up, The Cat Lady).

Peter Färberböck, from Adventure Corner, stated the remake would not be for everyone. As for the audio, he pointed out how the game employs different music genres to generate distinct moods, while criticizing the varied quality of the voice acting. The reviewer was pleased by the puzzles, which he considered organic and well-balanced, as well as the character writing and oppressive atmosphere. However, Färberböck felt the storyline became predictable by its midpoint.
