= Downfall (game) =

Commercial board game

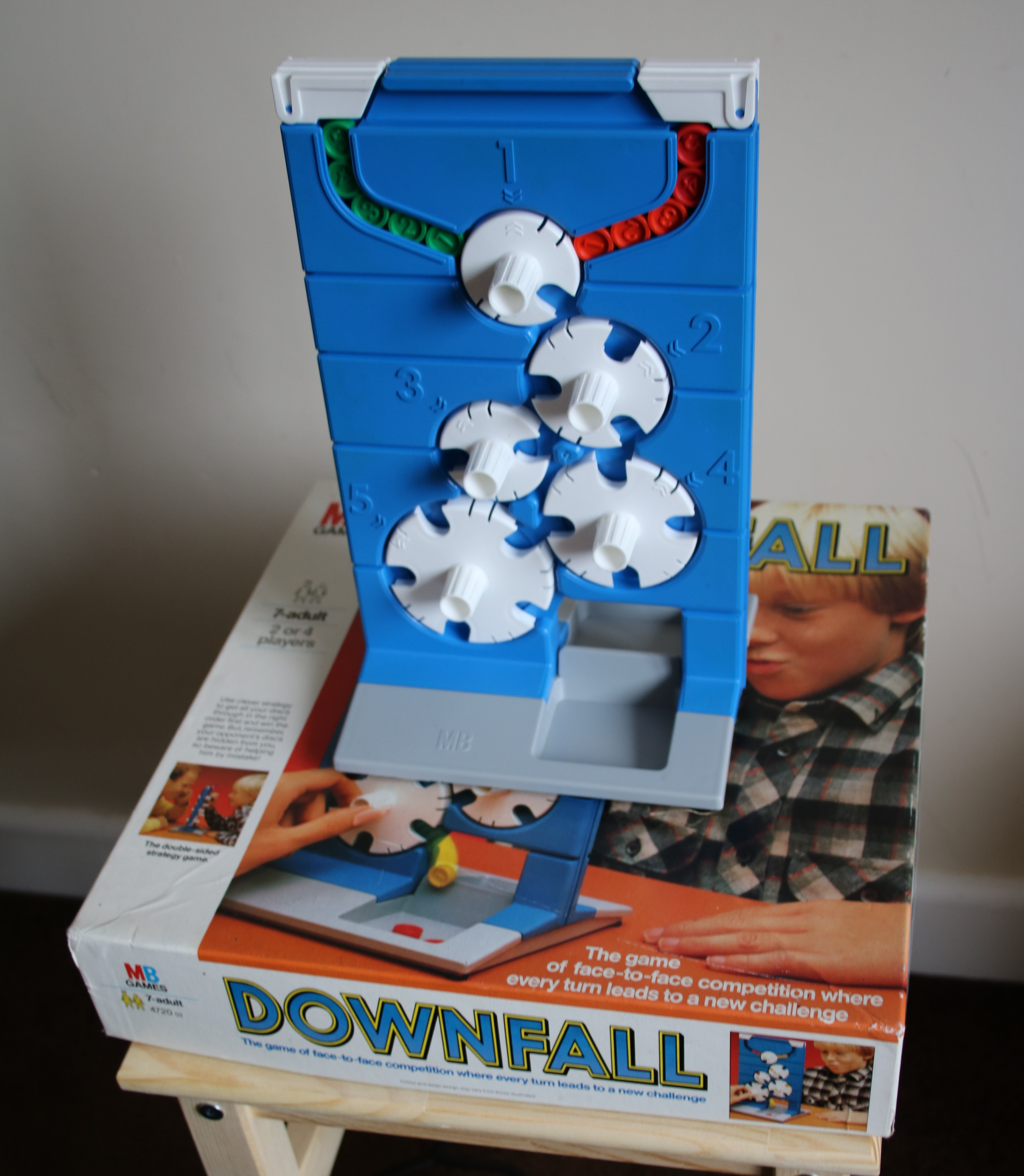
Downfall game

Downfall is a two-player game for players aged 7 and older, first marketed by the Milton Bradley Company in 1970.

The game consists of a vertical board with five slotted dials on each side. Each player starts with ten numbered tokens or discs at the top of the board, five on each side. The object of the game is to move the discs to the bottom of the board by turning the dials. Players alternate turns moving the dials and cannot move a dial that their opponent has just moved. Players cannot repeat the same dial more than three consecutive times. The winner is the first player to move all of their discs into the tray at the bottom, in sequence order (1-2-3-4-5). Discs falling out of sequence loses the game.

Since neither player can see the other's board, it is common to inadvertently advance - or hinder - the opponent's gameplay. The game rewards forward thinking and planning; players may try to "trap" their opponent into turning a dial that will advance their own disc, while trying to ensure that their own discs are not caught and dropped out of order.

The game is currently available in the UK under the name New Downfall, manufactured and marketed by Hasbro. The new version follows the same rules but has a more futuristic design in red and yellow.

The game's box art is parodied on the cover of Expert Knob Twiddlers, an album by Mike & Rich (Mike Paradinas & Richard D. James).

== Reviews ==
- Games & Puzzles
