= Nadine Dorries =

British politician (born 1957)

The Right Honourable Nadine Dorries
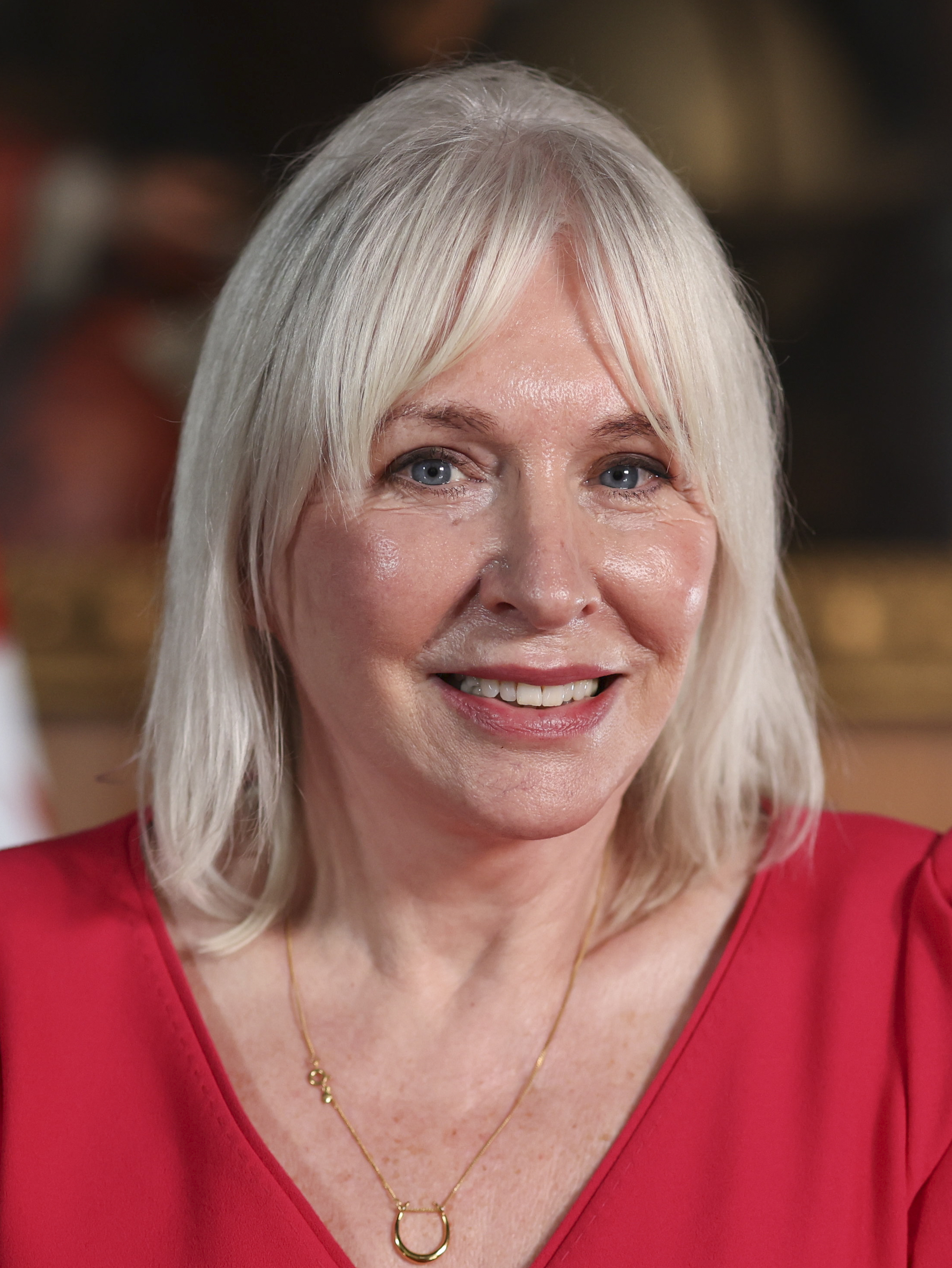
- Official portrait, 2021

Secretary of State for Digital, Culture, Media and Sport
- In office 15 September 2021 – 6 September 2022
- Prime Minister: Boris Johnson
- Preceded by: Oliver Dowden
- Succeeded by: Michelle Donelan

Minister of State for Patient Safety, Suicide Prevention and Mental Health (Note: Parliamentary Under-Secretary of State (2019–2020))
- In office 27 July 2019 – 15 September 2021
- Prime Minister: Boris Johnson
- Preceded by: Jackie Doyle-Price
- Succeeded by: Gillian Keegan (Note: As Minister of State for Care and Mental Health)

Member of Parliament for Mid Bedfordshire
- In office 5 May 2005 – 29 August 2023
- Preceded by: Jonathan Sayeed
- Succeeded by: Alistair Strathern

Personal details
- Born: Nadine Vanessa Bargery; 21 May 1957 (age 69) Liverpool, Merseyside, England
- Party: Reform UK (since 2025)
- Other political affiliations: Conservative (2000–2025)
- Spouse: Paul Dorries (m. 1984; div. 2007)
- Children: 3
- Education: Halewood Grange Comprehensive School
- Alma mater: Warrington General Hospital (nurse trainee)
- Occupation: Politician; nurse; businesswoman; author
- Nadine Dorries's voice Dorries explains the Online Safety Bill; Recorded 31 March 2022

Nadine Vanessa Dorries (née Bargery; born 21 May 1957) is a British author and former politician who served as Secretary of State for Digital, Culture, Media and Sport from 2021 to 2022. She was the Member of Parliament (MP) for Mid Bedfordshire from 2005 to 2023 for the Conservative Party. Since 2025, she has been a member of Reform UK.

Born in Liverpool to a working-class family, Dorries was raised in the city's district of Anfield and the nearby towns of Halewood and Runcorn. She began work as a trainee nurse in Warrington and subsequently became a medical representative. During her early career, she spent a year in Zambia as head of a community school. After returning to England, she founded Company Kids Ltd, which provided child day-care services for working parents. She sold the company in 1998. She was elected to the House of Commons at the 2005 general election for the Conservative safe seat of Mid Bedfordshire.

As a backbencher, Dorries introduced several unsuccessful private member's bills, including attempts to reduce the time limit for abortions in the UK and changes to the rules regarding counselling for the women involved, and the advocacy of sexual abstinence for girls in sex education. An opponent of John Bercow, she attempted to have him removed as Speaker of the House of Commons. She also clashed with David Cameron and George Osborne, describing them as "two arrogant posh boys".

In 2012, she lost the Conservative whip after she took part in the reality TV programme I'm a Celebrity...Get Me Out of Here! without informing the chief whip. The whip was returned in 2013 and she was re-admitted to the parliamentary party. During her time on I’m a Celebrity…Get Me Out of Here! in 2012, she was repeatedly voted by the public to undergo Bushtucker Trials, including one in which she ate an ostrich’s anus.

In July 2019, Boris Johnson appointed Dorries as Parliamentary Under-Secretary of State for Patient Safety, Suicide Prevention and Mental Health. In May 2020, she was promoted to a minister of state. In Johnson's cabinet reshuffle in September 2021, he promoted her to Secretary of State for Digital, Culture, Media and Sport. Despite being invited to continue in the position, she resigned as Culture Secretary ahead of the formation of the Truss ministry, after Liz Truss took over from Johnson on 6 September 2022.

On 9 June 2023, Dorries announced her intention to stand down as an MP with immediate effect. She later changed her position, saying that she would not proceed with her resignation until she had received information relating to why she had been refused a peerage in Boris Johnson's resignation honours. Following mounting pressure, she formally vacated her seat on 29 August. Dorries had not spoken in the House of Commons since leaving the government in July 2022, or worked on any bill or select committees, and was criticised by both Tory and opposition MPs for allegedly abandoning her constituents.

== Early life ==
Dorries was born Nadine Vanessa Bargery in Liverpool on 21 May 1957. Her father was an immigrant Irish Roman Catholic bus driver who became a lift operator. Her mother was an Anglican, and Dorries was raised as such. She was brought up in the Anfield district of Liverpool, where she attended Rose Heath Primary School. In 2016, Dorries said that she had been abused by Anglican vicar and family friend William Cameron, who was made priest-in-charge at St Mary's Anglican church in Halewood in 1966, when she was nine. She said that at the time, she was too ashamed to report this to her parents or authorities, but the stories of child sexual abuse described in novels she wrote as an adult are based on her own experience.

After primary school, she attended Halewood Grange Comprehensive School before moving with her family to Runcorn. She grew up on a council estate and entered nursing in 1975 as a trainee at Warrington General Hospital. According to an interview with The Times in 2014, Dorries's parents divorced during her adolescence. While training to be a nurse at 21, she shared a flat with her father. He died at the age of 42.

== Early career ==
From 1978 to 1981, Dorries was a nurse in Warrington and Liverpool according to a 2009 report. When she was a parliamentary candidate in 2001, her CV stated Liverpool and London as places where she worked as a nurse. She left the Liverpool area after she married mining engineer Paul Dorries.

In 1982, Dorries became a medical representative to Ethicla Ltd for a year, before spending a year in Zambia (1983–84) as the head of a community school, where her husband ran a copper mine. In 1987 she founded Company Kids Ltd, which provided child day-care services for working parents. The company was sold in 1998 to BUPA; Dorries was subsequently a director of the health provider during the following year.

As Nadine Bargery, she was selected as the prospective parliamentary candidate (PPC) for Hazel Grove, near Manchester in spring 2000. Her candidacy split the constituency party, and she was briefly deselected in August before being imposed by Conservative Central Office. Standing for the seat at the 2001 general election, she was unsuccessful in her attempt to succeed the Liberal Democrat candidate Andrew Stunell, who retained the seat with a majority of 8,435 votes. Dorries worked for three years as a special adviser to Oliver Letwin, when Shadow Chancellor, to sort out his relations with the media amongst other things.

== Parliamentary career (2005–2023) ==
Dorries won the Conservative candidacy for the safe seat of Mid Bedfordshire in 2005 on the retirement through ill health after a series of scandals of Jonathan Sayeed. In 2009, she gave this account of her selection:

Three weeks before the 2005 general election I, a council estate Scouser, was selected as the Conservative candidate to represent a southern rural constituency. Because the vacancy occurred so quickly and so close to D-day, the party provided my association with a shortlist of seventeen candidates, of which about five were women. Following a long day of interviews in hot sunny rooms, the list was whittled down to a shortlist of three ... I was informed that I had been selected outright on the first ballot ... That pride, that sense of achievement, the knowledge that I was selected on the basis of my performance and merit above all other candidates on that day is what enables me to hold my head up high in this place.

Dorries's account of her own selection appears to contradict a news report which The Times ran at the time, reporting that Conservative Campaign Headquarters placed a majority of women on the shortlist and pressed for the selection of a female candidate:

Mrs Dorries, who has three teenage children, easily beat her 11 rivals and won the plum safe seat on the first ballot at the selection this weekend. Party officials were thrilled that the seat has gone to a woman. Previously, only two women had been selected in the 17 safe seats where sitting MPs have retired. Senior party figures had made clear to local dignitaries that they would like the seat to go to a woman and presented the constituency with a shortlist of seven women and five men to underline the point.

Dorries was elected to the House of Commons at the 2005 general election with a majority of 11,355, and made her maiden speech on 25 May 2005.

Dorries initially supported David Davis to become Conservative leader in 2005, later withdrawing her endorsement. She stated that David Cameron, the successful candidate, "represented everything that through my life ... [I have] been suspicious of." In May 2007, she criticised Cameron for ignoring the recommendations of the Conservative public policy working group in favour of grammar schools. However, she did defend the selection of Liz Truss in 2009, whose Conservative candidature was called into question after an extra-marital affair was revealed.

Dorries served as a member of the Innovation, Universities, Science and Skills Committee, although by November 2008 she had attended only 2% of sessions. The committee then reformed as the Science and Technology Select Committee; she did not attend a single session. In 2010, she was elected to the Health Select Committee.

In May 2008, Dorries featured in the Channel 4 Dispatches documentary "In God's Name". The programme examined the growing influence of Christian evangelical movements in the UK and highlighted the Lawyers' Christian Fellowship's involvement in lobbying the British Government on issues such as abortion, gay rights and the enforcing of laws relating to blasphemy. The programme included footage of an LCF representative meeting with Dorries to influence policy on matters where they had a common agenda.

In February 2010 Dorries took part in the Channel 4 documentary series Tower Block of Commons, in which MPs stay with welfare claimants.

Dorries was re-elected in the 2010 general election with an increased majority and a swing of 2.3% from the Liberal Democrats.

In 2013, Dorries's daughter was reportedly among the highest-earning family members employed by MPs with a salary of £40,000–45,000 as an office manager, even though her daughter lived 96 miles away from the office. Subsequently, Dorries's sister was taken on as "senior secretary" with a salary of £30,000–35,000. In reply to an enquiry by Ben Glaze, deputy political editor of the Daily Mirror, about the employment of her daughter, Dorries tweeted: "Be seen within a mile of my daughters and I will nail your balls to the floor... using your own front teeth. Do you get that?"

In October 2013, Dorries described a fellow Conservative MP, Kris Hopkins, as "one of parliament's slimiest, nastiest MPs" on her Twitter account, and criticised Prime Minister Cameron's decision to promote Hopkins to a junior ministerial post within the Department for Communities and Local Government as "a really awful decision".

On 29 May 2015, the independent candidate in Mid Bedfordshire, Tim Ireland, lodged an appeal against the result accusing Dorries of breaches of Section 106 of the Representation of the People Act 1983 by making false statements about his character. The development first emerged in early June after the three-week petition for such an action had expired. The petition was rejected by the High Court of Justice because it was served at Dorries's constituency office and not her home address.

=== Damian McBride email affair ===
In April 2009, Dorries stated that she had commenced legal action following the leaked publication of emails sent by Damian McBride, Prime Minister Gordon Brown's head of strategy and planning, which suggested spreading a rumour that Dorries had a one-night stand with a fellow MP, in an email to Derek Draper, a Labour-supporting blogger. McBride resigned and Dorries denounced the accusation as libellous: "[t]he allegations regarding myself are 100 per cent untrue", and demanded an apology intent on exposing the Number 10 "cesspit".

Brown subsequently said he was "sorry" and that he took "full responsibility for what happened". Dorries threatened libel proceedings against McBride, Draper and Downing Street but did not carry out that threat. McBride paid Dorries an undisclosed sum, estimated at £1,000 plus £2,500 towards her costs.

=== Expenses claims ===
In May 2009, The Telegraph, as part of its exposure of MPs' expenses claims, questioned whether the property in Dorries's constituency, on which she claimed £24,222 additional costs allowance (for "secondary" housing costs), had been in fact her main or only home from 2007 onwards. The newspaper also queried hotel bills, including one for 'Mr N Dorries': these had been disallowed by the Fees Office and Dorries said they were submitted by mistake. On 22 May 2009, she spoke on BBC Radio 4 and drew parallels between the McCarthy 'Witch-Hunts' and the press's 'drip-drip' revelation of MP's expenses, eliciting Cameron's public criticism. She said everyone was fearing a 'suicide', and colleagues were constantly checking up on each other. Later in the day her blog was taken down. It transpired that Withers, lawyers acting for the Barclay Brothers, the owners of the Daily Telegraph, had required the removal of the blog, on threat of libel action against the service provider.

In January 2010, it was reported that Dorries was still being investigated by John Lyon, the Parliamentary Commissioner for Standards, regarding her claim for second home expenses. There was some debate as to the location of her main home. It was also reported that Dorries had claimed £20,000 in office expenses for work undertaken by a media relations and public affairs company.

On 9 May 2010, two days after being returned at the general election for Mid Bedfordshire, The Times reported that Dorries was facing the first complaint about an MP's expenses claim of the new parliament. The newspaper reported that she had claimed around £10,000 for an annual report in 2007 on her performance as an MP, but that her former Commons researcher had never seen the report or worked on it. Dorries insisted that she had indeed published the report, placing a photograph of it on her blog. She subsequently told the Biggleswade Advertiser that the report was never printed and a credit note issued with refund on 13 September 2008.

On 13 January 2011, it was reported by the Daily Mirror that police were investigating Dorries concerning her expenses. Three days later, The Sunday Times reported that police had since handed a file to the Crown Prosecution Service for consideration. In February 2013, it was reported that Dorries was being investigated by the Independent Parliamentary Standards Authority over her expenses, although no specific details were given at this time.

On 27 June 2013, Dorries announced she would no longer claim her personal expenses as an MP, but would draw on her salary for such costs. She argued that she would be in a better position to campaign for the abolition of the present expenses arrangements by doing so. Dorries stood for election as a deputy speaker after one of the three posts became vacant. In the Commons vote during October 2013 she was the first of the six candidates to be eliminated, with 13 votes.

=== Blog ===
A complaint from the Liberal Conspiracy website, regarding Dorries's use of the House of Commons' Portcullis emblem on her blog, had been upheld in March 2008, on the basis that Dorries "gave the impression it had some kind of parliamentary endorsement or authority".

On 21 October 2010, the MP's standards watchdog criticised Dorries for maintaining a blog which would "mislead constituents" as to how much actual time she was spending in her constituency. Dorries announced: "my blog is 70% fiction and 30% fact! It is written as a tool to enable my constituents to know me better and to reassure them of my commitment to Mid Bedfordshire. I rely heavily on poetic licence and frequently replace one place name/event/fact with another." Referring to her main home being in Gloucestershire, she said: "I have always been aware that should my personal domestic arrangements become the knowledge of my political opponents, they would be able to exaggerate that to good effect."

She gave an explanation of the statement to her local newspaper, in which she said that her whereabouts on her blog had been disguised, on police advice, because of unwanted attention. She also said that she made the statement in order to protect her staff and family.

On 27 October 2010, Dorries partially retracted her 70% fiction claim, posting a blog entry which stated that "It also only takes any individual with a smattering of intelligence to see that everything on the blog is accurate, because it is largely a record of real time events. It was only ever the perception of where I was on any particular day which was disguised."

The conservative journalist Peter Oborne suggested, in his Daily Telegraph blog a fortnight later, that Cameron should have "ordered Mrs Dorries to apologise personally to her constituents, and stripped her of the party whip there and then".

=== Visit to Equatorial Guinea with other MPs ===
In August 2011, Dorries led the first delegation of Members of Parliament to Equatorial Guinea. She met the Prime Minister of Equatorial Guinea, Ignacio Milam Tang. She reportedly said to him: "We are here to dispel some of the myths about Equatorial Guinea and also with humility to offer you help to avoid the mistakes we have made." According to the official website of Equatorial Guinea, Dorries was one of nine MPs on the trip.

=== Reality TV and temporary suspension ===
Early in November 2012, it was announced that Dorries had agreed to appear on I'm a Celebrity... Get Me Out of Here!. Other Conservatives objected to her decision and her constituents were "overwhelmingly negative" on local radio. Neither the Conservative chief whip, Sir George Young, nor the chairman of the Mid Bedfordshire Conservative Association were informed of her absence from Parliament. The Conservative Party suspended Dorries from the party whip on 6 November, after her confirmation that she was planning to be absent from Parliament. John Lyon, the Parliamentary Commissioner for Standards, received a complaint about her behaviour.

The series began on 11 November 2012, but on 21 November, Dorries became the first contestant to be voted off the show. On 27 November Dorries met Sir George Young, who asked her to rebuild her relationship with the party. She then sat as an independent MP, but continued to deny the whip had been withdrawn, stating it had merely been suspended.

On 8 May 2013, Dorries regained the Conservative whip without any conditions having been applied. George Osborne reportedly objected to her regaining the parliamentary whip, while commentators speculated that, should she not be readmitted, Dorries might join UKIP, which had made gains from the Conservatives in the previous week's local elections. Peter Oborne observed at this point that Dorries had still not declared the amount she was paid for her appearance on I'm a Celebrity... in the register of members interests, last published on 22 April, despite her promise to do so.

Shortly after regaining the whip, Dorries floated the idea of joint Conservative–UKIP candidates at the next general election in 2015, with herself as such a candidate. "This is not party policy and it's not going to happen", a Conservative Party spokesman told the Press Association.

Following the publication of a report by the Standards Committee on 11 November 2013, Dorries apologised in the House of Commons to her fellow MPs for two errors of judgement. Her confidentiality agreement with ITV over her fee for appearing on I'm A Celebrity... had led to her refusing to disclose the information to Kathryn Hudson, the parliamentary commissioner for standards. In so doing, she had broken the MP's code of conduct. The all-party standards committee said that she should never have agreed to such a clause in her contract. In addition, Dorries had falsely claimed that payment for eight pieces of work in the media did not need to be declared as they were made to Averbrook, her company, rather than to herself directly. Andy McSmith, writing in The Independent at the beginning of December 2013, said that Dorries had finally disclosed her income (amounting to £20,228 in total) from appearing on I'm a Celebrity... in the register of members' interests.

=== Brexit ===
In the June 2016 EU referendum, Dorries supported the Leave campaign and was critical of Cameron, who backed Remain. Dorries called for Cameron to resign during the campaign in May 2016, and submitted a letter of no confidence to Graham Brady, chairman of the 1922 Committee.

BuzzFeed reported that in October 2017 Dorries had become confused about her party's position on Brexit after talking with a politics teacher about a key element of her party's position, Britain's proposed exit from the European Union Customs Union. The EU Customs Union is an agreement between EU members not to impose tariffs (i.e. import taxes) on goods passing across their mutual borders. From a semi-private discussion that BuzzFeed made public, it was suggested that Dorries believed the UK could leave the EU but stay within the Customs Union whilst at the same time negotiating free trade deals with other countries. Later in December 2017 she tweeted: "If we stay in the Single Market and the Customs Union, we haven't left."

In November 2018, Dorries, who was strongly in favour of Brexit, said of the Withdrawal Agreement negotiated between the UK Government and the EU27: "This is a very sad place to be, but unfortunately, the future of the country and of our relationship with Europe is at stake. This deal gives us no voice, no votes, no MEPs, no commissioner".

=== Minister for Patient Safety, Suicide Prevention and Mental Health (2019–2021) ===
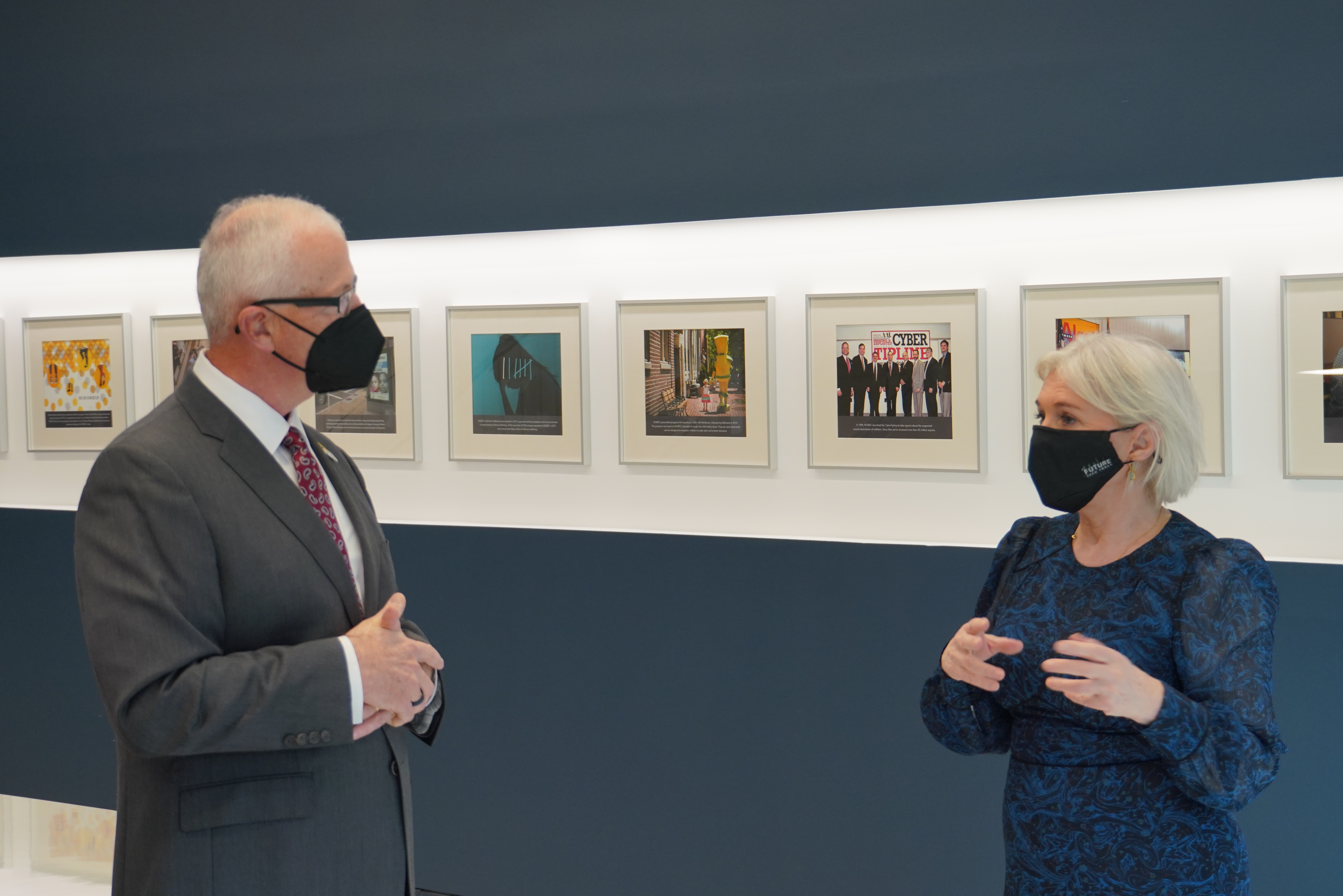
Dorries visiting the National Center for Missing & Exploited Children in 2021

When Boris Johnson became prime minister in July 2019, Dorries was appointed as Parliamentary Under-Secretary of State for Patient Safety, Suicide Prevention and Mental Health at the Department of Health and Social Care. She was promoted in May 2020 to the ministerial rank of Minister of State for Patient Safety, Suicide Prevention and Mental Health.

On 10 March 2020, Dorries became the first MP to be diagnosed with COVID-19. It is not known exactly when she contracted the disease, but it was reported that she had attended Parliament and visited 10 Downing Street before being required to self-isolate.

On 14 May 2020, Dorries was criticised after she retweeted a doctored video from a far-right Twitter account which falsely claimed that Labour leader Keir Starmer obstructed the prosecution of grooming gangs while he served as Director of Public Prosecutions.

In November 2020, Dorries attracted media criticism after rejecting an offer of cross-party talks to discuss a mental health support package for frontline NHS and care staff during the COVID-19 pandemic. In March 2021, she defended the government's 1% NHS pay offer on the grounds that it would protect the financial support of those on furlough, stating that the "unprecedented" pressure on the UK's finances was behind the pay offer.

=== Secretary of State for Digital, Culture, Media and Sport (2021–2022) ===
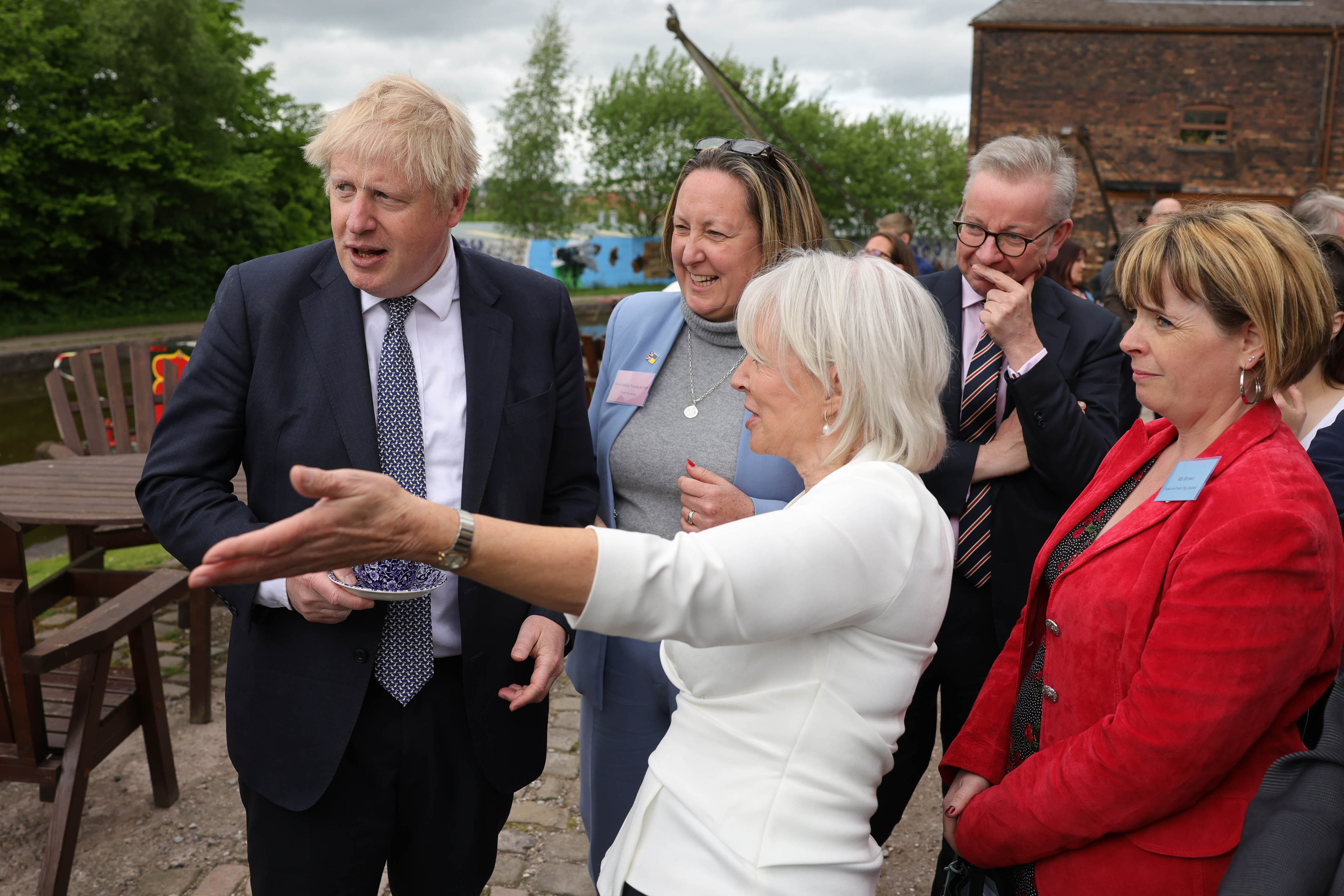
Dorries with Boris Johnson and Michael Gove at a canalside venue in Birmingham, during the 2022 Commonwealth Games

On 15 September 2021, Dorries was promoted as Secretary of State for Digital, Culture, Media and Sport following Oliver Dowden's appointment as Conservative Party Co-chairman. She is a critic of what she believes to be elitism in the BBC and favoured "BBC reform".

In February 2022, amidst a controversy over a joke about Romani genocide, made by Jimmy Carr on a Netflix special, Dorries said that the government would bring in legislation to "hold to account" streaming companies for offensive content. She said there was no disconnect between this view and her previous opinions that "left-wing snowflakes are killing comedy".

In April 2022, Prime Minister Boris Johnson reported that Dorries had personally called Nick Clegg, vice president of global affairs at Facebook’s parent company Meta, and requested that Facebook remove the video of British journalist Graham Phillips' interview with Aiden Aslin. Clegg complied with the request, and removed the video.

During her tenure as Secretary of State, Dorries attempted to push through the privatisation of Channel 4. Her attempts to justify the move received public and industry backlash and at times ridicule, in part due to comments stating that a 2010 reality TV show she took part in had involved paid actors, despite denials from the production company, and having previously incorrectly claimed that the channel was publicly-funded when it is funded by advertising. The privatisation plans were later abandoned by her immediate successor Michelle Donelan, being seen by some as confirmation that privatisation had been "motivated by political opposition to Channel 4’s output rather than a sound business case".

During the July–September 2022 Conservative Party leadership election, Dorries was reported as considering herself as a candidate, but ultimately did not stand and instead endorsed Liz Truss.

In July 2022, Dorries personally granted Grade II listed status to a plaque of Cecil Rhodes in Oxford which she stated was of "special historic interest". This decision was controversial as Rhodes had been labelled the "architect of apartheid" because he passed laws in the Cape Colony that expropriated land from black Africans and effectively banned them from political participation.

=== Return to the back benches and resignation (2022–2023) ===
On 5 September 2022, in anticipation of the appointment of Liz Truss as prime minister, Dorries tendered her resignation as culture secretary (effective 6 September) and returned to the back benches. Truss had asked Dorries to stay on as Secretary of State in her new government, but Dorries instead decided to step down to concentrate on writing books.

On 9 February 2023, Dorries announced that she would not seek re-election at the next general election, blaming "infighting and stupidity" that led to the July 2022 government crisis and Johnson's resignation. On 9 June 2023, she announced that she was "standing down" as an MP "with immediate effect", rather than waiting for the next election, which would trigger a by-election in her constituency.

Writing in the Daily Mail on 12 June 2023, Dorries stated that she believed her removal from the list of life peerages in Boris Johnson's resignation honours list had been as a result of a block by "sinister forces". The House of Lords Appointments Commission had required MPs nominated for peerages to commit to standing down from the Commons within six months or else be omitted from the list. Dorries stated that she had submitted a subject access request to the House of Lords Appointments Commission and was waiting to resign until she had received all unredacted "WhatsApps, text messages, all emails and minutes of meetings" related to why she was denied a peerage.

Dorries was one of ten parliamentarians personally named in a Commons Select Committee of Privileges special report on the "co-ordinated campaign of interference in the work of the Privileges Committee", published on 28 June 2023. The report detailed how said parliamentarians "took it upon themselves to undermine procedures of the House of Commons" by putting pressure on the Commons Privileges Committee investigation into Boris Johnson.

The statement to stand down immediately and subsequent retraction of that was subject to mounting public criticism throughout the Summer. Within her constituency two town councils published open letters calling on her to resign. Flitwick Town Council wrote to Dorries on 26 July 2023, formally raising the council's concerns and frustration at what it perceived as a continuing lack of representation for the people of Mid Bedfordshire at Westminster. Representing over 13,800 voters, the council cited Dorries's recent poor voting record in the House of Commons and alleged that Dorries had not held a surgery in Flitwick since 7 March 2020. The council signed off the letter: "Our residents desperately need effective representation now, and Flitwick Town Council calls on you to immediately vacate your seat to allow a by-election." On 17 August Shefford Town Council also called on her to resign, criticising the "continuing lack of representation for the people of Mid Bedfordshire" due to a lack of participation within the community or at Westminster.

Within the wider political world criticism came from within her own party and others. Prime Minister Rishi Sunak's press secretary stated that "It’s obviously unusual to have an MP say they will resign with immediate effect and for that not to take place" while Sunak himself later publicly stated that "I think people deserve to have an MP that represents them, wherever they are". Several Conservative MPs also publicly criticised her for continuing as an MP despite her statements about resigning. Meanwhile members of both the Labour Party and Liberal Democrats publicly called on her to resign and announced they would seek to force her out via parliamentary means if she didn't formally resign.

On 24 August, Dorries responded to the growing criticism, releasing a statement stating that she and her caseworkers were "working daily with constituents". She also claimed that the criticism concerning her conduct and associated calls to resign were down to "political opponents, such as Labour-run Flitwick town council are choosing the summer and news-hungry outlets in the summer recess to be noted".

In a letter to Sunak published on 26 August, Dorries explicitly signified her resignation as an MP while criticising his administration, accusing him of abandoning the "fundamental principles of Conservatism" and "opening the gates to whip up a public frenzy against one of his own MPs". In response to her resignation letter, Conservative MP Sir Robert Neill stated that Dorries had "become an embarrassment" and that her claims "were obviously motivated by personal bitterness and bile". Tobias Ellwood referred to the manner of her departure as a "selfish charade" and an "undignified chapter ... an episode of colleagues throwing their teddies in the corner, in this case for simply not getting a peerage".

On 29 August, Dorries was appointed to the position of Steward and Bailiff of the Three Hundreds of Chiltern, thereby vacating her seat in the Commons. The ensuing by-election in Mid Bedfordshire, held on 19 October, was won by Alistair Strathern of the Labour Party, with the largest Conservative majority overturned by Labour in a by-election since 1945.

== After Parliament ==
On 4 September 2025, Dorries said that she had defected to Reform UK.

== Author ==
It became public knowledge in September 2013 that Dorries had signed a three-book deal for a six-figure advance; her first book was published the following April.

Her first novel, The Four Streets, which draws on her Liverpool Catholic background, became a No.1 best-selling e-book with 100,000 copies sold in the format by July 2014, although print sales in hardback and paperback were significantly lower with, respectively, 2,735 and 637 sales by then. Dorries's work of fiction gained mostly negative reviews.

Sarah Ditum in the New Statesman complained that some of the sentences "read like clippings from Wikipedia" while Christopher Howse, writing for The Telegraph, described The Four Streets as "the worst novel I've read in 10 years". "You should read the next one. It's much better", Dorries told Ann Treneman of The Times.

By 2022, Dorries had published 16 books and announced a series of six more with publisher Head of Zeus.

In 2023 it emerged that Dorries was writing a book intended to cover the downfall of Boris Johnson, titled The Plot. Despite initially intending to release in September 2023, just before the Conservative party conference, the release was pushed back due to legal checks needing to be undertaken. The book was released on 9 November 2023 and alleges that a clique of Conservatives in the "Westminster bubble" – including members of the Cabinet, civil service, and special advisers, some of whom were given pseudonyms such as "Dr No", "The Wolf" (Dougie Smith) and "The Dark Lord" (Dominic Cummings) – planned to overthrow Boris Johnson as prime minister and undermine her power as a minister. She also alleges that this secretive group tried to install Stephen Gilbert as the head of Ofcom instead of Michael Grade, who eventually got the job. The book was described as "the single weirdest book I have ever read" by Patrick Maguire in The Times; Christopher Howse in The Telegraph writes: "What The Plot reminded me of was a minor classic in medicine: Illustrations of Madness by John Haslam ... Haslam meant to show that the patient who discovered this conspiratorial plot was mad. Nadine Dorries means to show that Boris Johnson was deposed by plotters who had raised up and brought down his predecessors. But apply Ockham's razor and the explanation is simpler and saner. For the nagging objection that remains in the reader's mind is that any prime minister is surrounded by rivals who might supplant him. His fall is no conspiracy if his own errors and shortcomings turn him into a liability." Gaby Hinsliff in The Guardian wrote that "To claim this loose and ideologically disparate clique has been secretly calling the shots ever since [the early 2000s], arbitrarily installing and dispatching Tory leaders for no particular ideological reason and by methods unclear, is to make the classic conspiracy theorist’s mistake of superimposing orderly design on chaos."

== Political views ==
Dorries, described as "a right-wing, working-class Conservative", is a member of the socially conservative Cornerstone Group.

=== Abortion time limits and counselling ===
Dorries says she witnessed "botched" abortions on two occasions, an experience that influenced her campaign to lower the point during a pregnancy at which an abortion can be performed.

On 31 October 2006, Dorries introduced a private member's bill in the House of Commons, which would have reduced the time limit for abortion in Great Britain from 24 to 21 weeks; introduced a ten-day 'cooling-off' period for women wishing to have an abortion, during which time the woman would be required to undergo counselling; and accelerate access to abortion at the end of the cooling-off period. Dorries said she had received death threats from activists and was given police protection. Parliament voted by 187 to 108 to reject the bill.

In May 2008, Dorries tabled an amendment to the proposed Human Fertilisation and Embryology Bill seeking to reduce the upper limit for abortions from the current 24 weeks of pregnancy to 20 weeks. Reportedly written by Andrea Williams, then of The Lawyers' Christian Fellowship, Dorries has denied that her campaigning on the abortion issue receives funding from Christian fundamentalist groups, although Dorries's website for the "20 Reasons for 20 Weeks" campaign in 2008 was registered by Christian Concern For Our Nation (CCFON), another organisation with which Williams is involved; one of the pressure group's interns set up the website without charge to Dorries. According to Guardian journalist Kira Cochrane, it was the greatest challenge to women's abortion rights in nearly 20 years. Andrea Williams (now director of Christian Concern and Christian Legal Centre) was a team member of the campaign. In the Channel 4 Dispatches documentary, "In God's Name", Dorries was asked how closely she worked with Williams and Dorries replied, "Closely? We've been stuck to the hip. Very closely." In reference to her campaign, Dorries also said:

What goes on in here would have no structure whatsover, no sense of achievement if it wasn't for people like Andrea on the outside. You know, the Lawyers' Christian Fellowship, the Medical Christian Fellowship on this particular issue are absolutely vital because they give us the information.

Dorries's amendment was defeated by 332 votes to 190, with a separate 22-week limit opposed by 304 votes to 233. A majority of MPs continued to support the 24-week limit. She said of her tactics on this issue in 2007: "If I were to argue that all abortions should be banned, the ethical discussions would go round in circles ... My view is that the only way forward is to argue for a reduction in the time limit ... it's every baby's right to have a life."

Dorries proposed amendments to the Health and Social Care Bill 2011 which would have blocked abortion services such as BPAS and Marie Stopes International from providing counselling services. She argued that these organisations had a vested financial interest in encouraging abortions, but according to Zoe Williams "independent" counselling services could be "faith-based groups" intent on discouraging women from having an abortion. Cameron's government at first supported the proposal, but later changed its mind, reportedly because then-Liberal Democrat leader and deputy prime minister Nick Clegg was opposed to the change.

Dorries's criticism of Cameron's policy shift was supported by some commentators such as Cristina Odone, who shared her concerns. Clegg's apparent opposition was, for Dorries, a means of "blackmailing our Prime Minister", and a question regarding Liberal Democrats' influence was the source of Cameron's description of Dorries as "extremely frustrated" at Prime Minister's questions on 7 September. Cameron was criticised by feminists among others for the comment, and subsequently apologised.

The issue of abortion counselling was debated in the Commons immediately following this incident. The motion was originally seconded by Labour MP Frank Field, but he withdrew his support after Health Minister Anne Milton intervened to suggest the Government would support the spirit of Dorries's amendment. The amendment was defeated by 368 votes to 118, a majority of 250. Despite this, Dorries claimed a victory because of Milton's comments.

=== Abstinence advocacy for girls in sex education ===
On 4 May 2011, Dorries proposed a bill to require that sex education in schools should include content promoting abstinence to girls aged 13–16, which was presented as teaching them "how to say no". While sex education already mentions the option of abstinence, the bill would have required active promotion of abstinence to girls, with no such requirement in the education provided to boys. Owing to Dorries's claims about practices used in teaching about sex, Sarah Ditum in The Guardian accused Dorries of making Sex and Relationship Education (SRE) "sound like a terrifying exercise in depravity".

The Bill drew criticism from healthcare and sex education professionals, questioning claims made during the Bill's reading. Labour MP Chris Bryant described the Bill as being "the daftest piece of legislation I have seen".

The Sexual Abstinence Bill was set for second reading on 20 January 2012 (Bill 185), after she was granted leave to introduce the Bill on a vote of 67 to 61 on 4 May 2011. The Bill, placed eighth on the order paper, was withdrawn shortly before its second reading.

=== Same-sex marriage ===
Dorries opposed the government's successful legislation to introduce same-sex marriage. In May 2012, on the Conservative Home website she wrote: "Gay marriage is a policy which has been pursued by the metro elite gay activists and needs to be put into the same bin [as reform of the House of Lords]". In an interview with Mehdi Hasan in October 2012, Dorries said she favoured gay marriage, but only after Britain has left the European Convention on Human Rights. In an exchange with Iain Dale around the same time, she speculated that the issue could cost her party four million votes at the next general election.

In February 2013, at the time of the Bill's second reading in the House of Commons, she argued that the bill avoided the issue of consummation and thus contradicted the Matrimonial Causes Act 1973, and therefore did not make gay marriage equal to heterosexual marriage. She also argued that there was no provision for adultery, or faithlessness, as it might apply to gay couples because the term applies to heterosexual couples only.

=== Burka ban ===
In August 2018, Boris Johnson was criticised for a column that he had written in The Daily Telegraph. As part of an article discussing the introduction of a burka ban in Denmark, Johnson said that Muslim women who wore burkas "look like letter boxes" and the garment gave them the appearance of "bank robbers", although the point of the article was to condemn governments who tell "a free-born adult woman what she may or may not wear, in a public place, when she is simply minding her own business". Dorries, however, said that Johnson "did not go far enough", saying the burka should have no place in Britain and it was "shameful that countries like France and Denmark are way ahead of us on this". On 7 August 2018, Dorries tweeted "No woman in a liberal, progressive society should be forced to cover up her beauty or her bruises."

=== John Bercow ===
Prior to John Bercow's election as Speaker of the House of Commons in June 2009, Dorries accused him of opportunism and disloyalty to the Conservative Party. She described his election as "a two-fingered salute to the British people from Labour MPs, and to the Conservative Party". After Bercow's wife, Sally, was approved as a Labour parliamentary candidate and gave an interview about her personal life, Dorries argued that the Bercows were damaging the historic respect accorded to the office of Speaker.

Dorries was reportedly part of a plot to oust Bercow from the Speaker's chair in the run-up to the 2010 general election, and, after the election, sent an email to all new MPs advocating his removal.

=== Cameron, Clegg and Osborne ===
On 6 March 2012, Dorries criticised Cameron and Nick Clegg of the coalition government over their taxation policies. Referring to the proposed cuts in child benefit, she told the Financial Times, "The problem is that policy is being run by two public schoolboys who don't know what it's like to go to the supermarket and have to put things back on the shelves because they can't afford it for their children's lunchboxes. What's worse, they don't care, either". She again criticised Cameron, and also George Osborne, in similar terms on 23 April, calling them "two arrogant posh boys who don't know the price of milk – who show no remorse, no contrition and no passion to want to understand the lives of others".

Osborne said on The Andrew Marr Show on 6 May 2012: "Nadine Dorries, for the last seven years, I don't think has agreed with anything either myself, David Cameron, or indeed most Conservatives in the leadership of the party have done." In the summer of 2012, Dorries criticised Osborne again for sending a badly briefed junior Treasury minister, Chloe Smith, to deputise for him on Newsnight in order to defend a government U-turn on fuel duty.

=== All-women shortlists ===
In a debate on Woman's Hour, broadcast on 22 August 2001, Dorries (as Nadine Bargery) had advocated all-women shortlists if the behaviour of Conservative selection committees did not change. In 2009 though, Dorries was highly critical of Cameron's proposal to consider using all-women shortlists, arguing against a move which would create "two classes of MPs". She wrote that "Sometimes I feel sorry for some of the Labour women who were selected via all-women shortlists. Everyone knows who they are. They are constantly derided."

== Personal life ==
Dorries married mining engineer Paul Dorries in 1984 with whom she had three daughters before separating in 2007 and subsequently divorcing.

Dorries has dyslexia.

== Honours ==
Dorries was sworn in as a member of the Privy Council on 20 September 2021 at Balmoral Castle. This gives her the honorific prefix "The Right Honourable".

=== Awards ===
In 2008, Dorries won The Spectator's Readers' Representative Award.

== Bibliography ==
- The Four Streets Saga series
  - The Four Streets (volume 1), Head of Zeus, April 2014, ISBN 978-1-78185-757-1
  - Hide Her Name (volume 2), Head of Zeus, December 2014, ISBN 978-1-78185-760-1
  - The Ballymara Road (volume 3), Head of Zeus, June 2015, ISBN 978-1-78185-763-2
  - Coming Home to the Four Streets (volume 4), Head of Zeus, 2021, ISBN 978-1-83893-905-2
- Run to Him (short story), Head of Zeus, November 2014, ISBN 978-1-78497-110-6
- A Girl Called Eilinora (short story), Head of Zeus, September 2015, ISBN 978-1-78497-473-2
- Ruby Flynn, Head of Zeus, November 2015, ISBN 978-1-78408-217-8
- The Lovely Lane series
  - The Angels of Lovely Lane (volume 1), Head of Zeus, June 2016, ISBN 978-1-78408-221-5
  - The Children of Lovely Lane (volume 2), Head of Zeus, December 2016, ISBN 978-1-78497-504-3
  - The Mothers of Lovely Lane (volume 3), Head of Zeus, June 2017, ISBN 978-1-78497-508-1
  - Christmas Angels (volume 4), Head of Zeus, November 2017, ISBN 978-1-78497-515-9
  - An Angel Sings (short story), Head of Zeus, November 2018, ISBN 978-1-78954-198-4
  - Snow Angels (volume 5), Head of Zeus, October 2019, ISBN 978-1-78954-480-0
- The Tarabeg series
  - Shadows in Heaven (volume 1), Head of Zeus, July 2018, ISBN 978-1-78669-748-6
  - Mary Kate (volume 2), Head of Zeus, January 2019, ISBN 978-1-78669-752-3
  - The Velvet Ribbon (volume 3), Head of Zeus, January 2020, ISBN 978-1-78669-756-1
- The Bellfont Legacy series (6 volumes announced)
  - A Wicked Woman (volume 1), Head of Zeus, announced March 2024, ISBN 978-1-83893-908-3
- The Plot: The Political Assassination of Boris Johnson, HarperCollins Publishers. published November 2023, ISBN 9780008623425
- Downfall: The Self-Destruction of the Conservative Party, HarperCollins Publishers, published November 2024, ISBN 978-0-00-873092-5

== See also ==
- Eric Gandar Dower - an earlier Conservative MP who repeatedly said they would resign their seat but did not do so.

== Notes ==
Parliament of the United Kingdom
| Preceded by Jonathan Sayeed | Member of Parliament for Mid Bedfordshire; 2005–2023 | Succeeded by Alistair Strathern |
Political offices
| Preceded by Jackie Doyle-Price | Parliamentary Under-Secretary of State State for Patient Safety, Suicide Prevention and Mental Health; 2019–2020 | Succeeded by Herself as Minister of State for Patient Safety, Suicide Prevention and Mental Health |
| Preceded by Herself as Parliamentary Under-Secretary of State for Patient Safety, Suicide Prevention and Mental Health | Minister of State for Patient Safety, Suicide Prevention and Mental Health; 2020–2021 | Succeeded by Gillian Keegan as Minister of State for Care and Mental Health |
| Preceded by Oliver Dowden | Secretary of State for Digital, Culture, Media and Sport; 2021–2022 | Succeeded by Michelle Donelan |
