= Christian Voice (UK) =

Fundamentalist Christian advocacy group based in the United Kingdom

- Type: Fundamentalist Christian advocacy group
- Headquarters: Carmarthen, Wales
- Region served: United Kingdom
- National Director: Stephen Green
- Website: christianvoice.org.uk

Christian Voice (CV) is a fundamentalist Christian advocacy group based in the United Kingdom. Its stated objective is "to uphold Christianity as the Faith of the United Kingdom, to be a voice for Biblical values in law and public policy, and to defend and support traditional family life." It is independent of religious, denominational, or political parties.

CV is led by Stephen Green. Green is the group's spokesperson, producing scores of press releases from 2005 to 2010. According to Green, Christian Voice had in excess of 600 members in 2005.

The group has been criticised for its positions. David Peel, leader of the United Reformed Church called Christian Voice "a disgrace" and described their "claim to represent Christians" in the UK as "absurd".

== Leadership ==
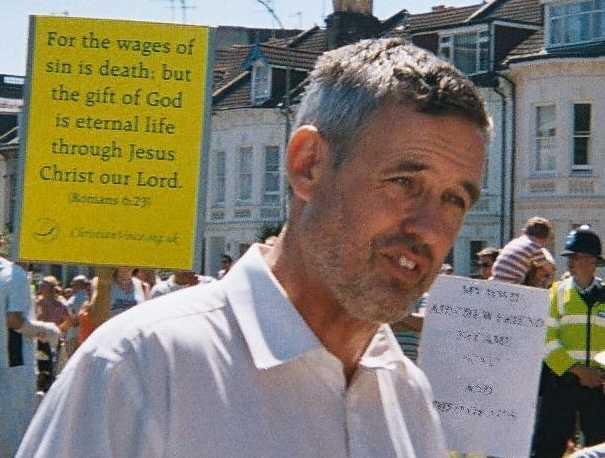
Stephen Green

The leader, and sole staff member, of Christian Voice is Stephen Green, a former Chairman of the Conservative Family Campaign, who attends an Assemblies of God Church. In the early 1990s, Green was a prominent campaigner against homosexuality through the Conservative Family Campaign, and wrote a book called The Sexual Dead-End, which opposed gay rights.

In January 2011, Green's former wife, Caroline Green, accused him of domestic violence. The couple subsequently divorced.

== Positions ==
Christian Voice has called for British law to be based on the Bible. It opposes abortion, homosexuality, no-fault divorce and compulsory sex education. Additionally it supports the death penalty and does not recognise the concept of marital rape. The group has also published a paper attacking Islam as untrue, and the portrayal of it as a religion of peace as false.

=== Homosexuality ===
Green has expressed support for the Uganda Anti-Homosexuality Bill (2009) and its associated penalty of death, stating "The Bible calls for the ultimate penalty for sodomy... A Parliamentarian in Uganda is trying to protect his nation's children. The House of Commons of the United Kingdom is trying to corrupt ours."

=== Abortion ===
According to the group, abortion is the killing of human beings comparable to The Holocaust.

=== Laws on marital rape ===
The group wants to overturn the law on marital rape, stating that the promises given by a man and woman to each other during the marriage service in the Book of Common Prayer establish a binding consent to sexual intercourse.

== Protests and campaigns ==
=== Homosexuality ===
The group has been involved in campaigns against the Gay Police Association. Christian Voice is opposed to police officers participating in gay pride marches, and in 2003 wrote to the Chief Constable of each force which it alleged allowed its officers to march in uniform at Pride events. The organisation published the replies on its website and, in the accompanying 16-page document Homosexuality and the Police, described homosexuality as "characterised by disease, degradation, death and denial" and Gay Pride as "intimidating".

On 2 September 2006, Green was arrested while handing out pamphlets urging homosexuals to "turn from their sins" at the Cardiff Mardi Gras. The police considered the leaflets hateful. The Crown Prosecution Service decided to withdraw their prosecution of Green on the grounds of insufficient evidence; the police stated that this did not "challenge the legality" of his arrest. Green's solicitor indicated he would seek damages in civil court for "abuse of police powers."

=== Blasphemy ===
Christian Voice was involved in criticism of British performances of Jerry Springer: The Opera, including a transmission of a performance by the BBC in 2005. The group stated that the production was blasphemous in its depiction of Jesus, Mary and God as guests on the Jerry Springer Show. Green said of the production,

Jerry Springer the Opera portrayed Jesus Christ as a nappy-wearing sexual deviant, who said he was 'a little bit gay'. It called Mary a rape victim, said the birth of Jesus was because 'the condom split', ridiculed His wounds on the cross and the sacrament of Holy Communion, had God as an ineffectual old man who needed guidance from Jerry Springer and finished up with Springer as a counterfeit saviour of mankind who told Jesus to "Grow up for Christ's sake and put some f***ing clothes on."

The group maintained a presence outside the Cambridge Theatre in London where it ran. It then mounted protests outside every theatre on the 2006 run of the show, attributing the financial disaster of the tour to divine intervention rather than its own actions.

Also in 2006, it mounted parallel protests outside the St Andrews University production of Terrence McNally gay rights play Corpus Christi.

Christian Voice started a campaign for people to complain to the BBC and published the home addresses and telephone numbers of two BBC executives on their web site, Jana Bennett (Director of Television) and Roly Keating (Controller of BBC Two). Keating subsequently received death threats.

On 8 January 2007, submissions were made on behalf of Stephen Green at Horseferry Road Magistrates Court to pursue private prosecutions for blasphemy against the Director-General of the BBC Mark Thompson and the show's producer, Jonathan Thoday. A summons was refused on 30 January 2007 due to lack of prima facie evidence that a crime had been committed, and the provisions of the 1968 Theatres Act, which enshrines the right of free expression in theatrical works. An appeal to the High Court was dismissed on 5 December 2007. On 5 March 2008 the House of Lords rejected the call to hear an appeal of the High Court's decision because "it did not raise an arguable point of law of general public importance".

The offenses of Blasphemy and Blasphemous Libel were abolished by the Criminal Justice and Immigration Act 2008 with effect from 8 July 2008.

=== HPV vaccine ===
CV placed an advertisement in the New Statesman asserting that HPV vaccines would make young people sterile. In January 2009, the Advertising Standards Authority ruled that the advertisement breached advertising regulations on accuracy. Christian Voice had predicted the ruling and responded "requiring the substantiation of a future prediction in an opinion piece is preposterous and an infringement of freedom of speech."

=== Other ===
In November 2008, following the failed private prosecution by Emily Mapfuwa over the display of a foot-high statue of Jesus with a phallus in the Baltic Centre for Contemporary Art, Gateshead, Stephen Green urged Christians to "create public disorder if [they] wish such a case to proceed in future", and stated that the artwork in question would "not survive being put on public display again."

On 8 January 2009, Christian Voice complained to the Advertising Standards Authority about the Atheist Bus Campaign's adverts on 800 buses across England, Scotland and Wales. CV objected to the slogan, "There's probably no God. Now stop worrying and enjoy your life." On 21 January, the ASA ruled that the adverts were not in breach of its rules as the advert "was an expression of the advertiser’s opinion" and was incapable of substantiation. They also claimed that although the advert was contrary to many people's beliefs, it would not generate "serious or widespread offence".

In December 2010, when the BBC aired The Nativity, described by the Church of England as a "gritty interpretation," Stephen Green objected to – in his eyes – the portrayal of Mary as a whore. He was documented in the press condemning the presentation saying "They wouldn’t mock the birth of Muhammad, or anything to do with his life story. They wouldn’t ridicule Hinduism or Sikhism, but Christianity is their big target."

== Controversy ==
In February 2005, Christian Voice was reported to have caused the cancer charity, Maggie's Centres, to decline a £3,000 donation from the proceeds of a special performance of Jerry Springer: The Opera. The charity had been due to receive £10 per ticket for an afternoon gala but declined the donation after CV had threatened to picket their centres, which offer palliative care to cancer sufferers and their families.

In June 2005, Christian Voice's bankers, the Co-operative Bank, instructed the group to close its account because the group's stance on homosexuality was in conflict with the bank's ethical policies of diversity. Gay Times awarded an ethical corporate stance award to the Co-operative Bank in response to this move. In response to this, Christian Voice encouraged a boycott of the bank.

== Media coverage ==
After the appearance of Green on Question Time in September 2005, the group was condemned by David Peel, then Moderator of the General Assembly of the United Reformed Church. Peel said:

It is a matter of some regret that ... the BBC should choose to undermine the reputation of Question Time by giving a platform to a small, self-selecting group distinguished by its claim to be a prophetic voice in this country ... Christian Voice has the right to express its extreme views, but it is as representative of Christian opinion in Britain as the Monster Raving Loony Party would be of mainstream political parties – and far less entertaining.

On 11 March 2008, Stephen Green was interviewed by openly gay celebrity Ian "H" Watkins for the BBC Wales programme Week in Week Out where he told Watkins his lifestyle was 'sinful', and made him no better than serial killer Jeffrey Dahmer.

Green then appeared on the BBC Wales programme Dragon's Eye on 13 November 2008, after a campaign by CV caused the book chain Waterstone's to cancel a book-signing by Welsh poet, Patrick Jones, described as "obscene and blasphemous" by Green. Jones instead read from his book at the Welsh Assembly. Philip Hensher, a commentator for The Independent newspaper, describes Green as a comic character, and Christian Voice as an extremist group. In The Guardian he has been described by George Monbiot as a "ranting homophobe".

In May 2008, Green was featured on the Channel 4 current affairs documentary series Dispatches – In God's Name as a leader in the fundamentalist movement in the United Kingdom. This prompted Joel Edwards, head of the Evangelical Alliance, to write a public letter discounting Green's impact on Christianity, and calling him an extremist.

== See also ==
- Christian Concern
