= Maria Caulfield =

British politician (born 1973)

Maria Caulfield CBE
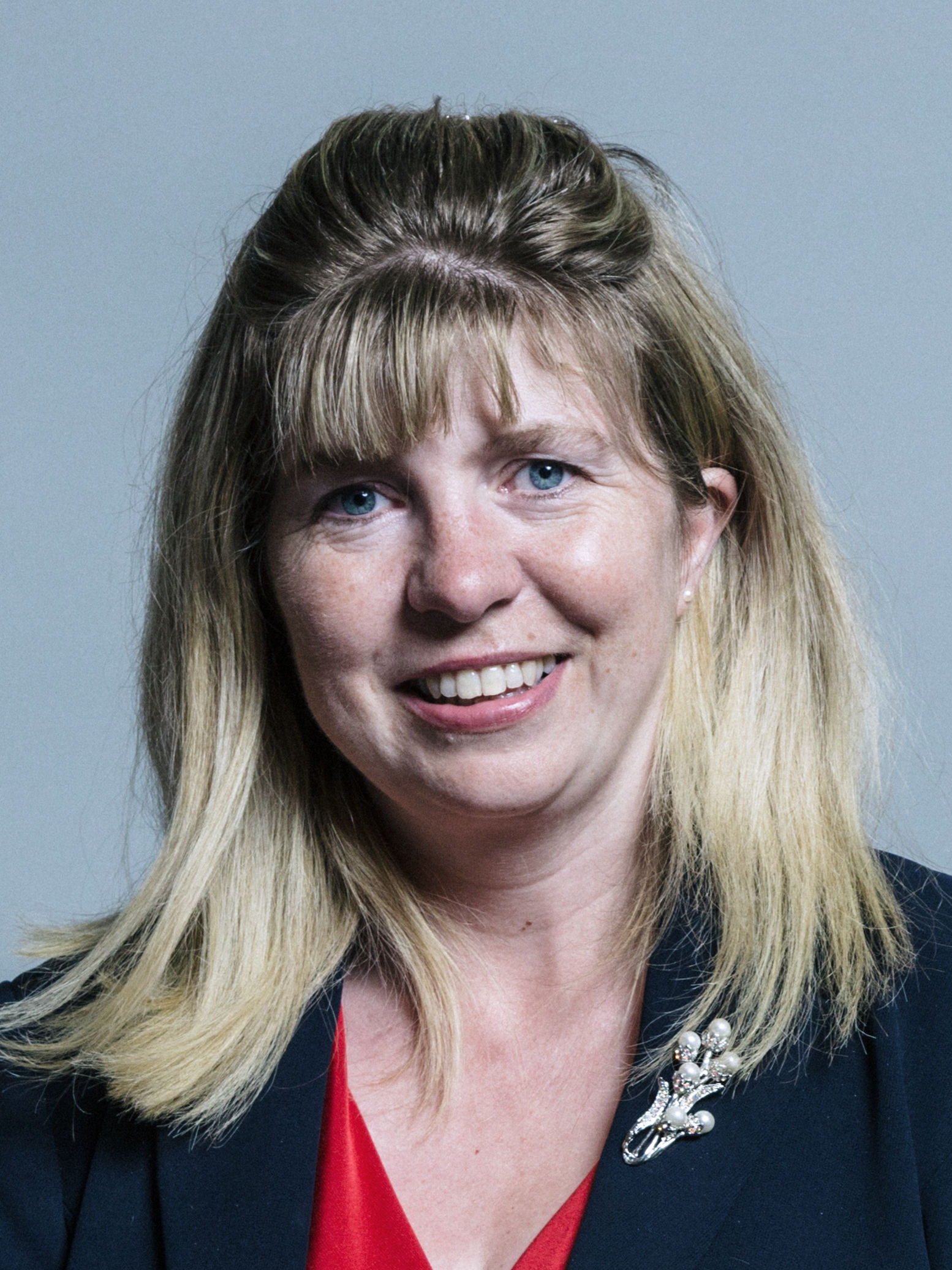
- Official portrait, 2017

Parliamentary Under-Secretary of State for Mental Health and Women's Health Strategy
- In office 27 October 2022 – 5 July 2024
- Prime Minister: Rishi Sunak
- Preceded by: Caroline Johnson (Note: As Parliamentary Under-Secretary of State for Mental Health and Public Health.)
- Succeeded by: The Baroness Merron of Lincoln (Note: As Parliamentary Under-Secretary of State for Patient Safety, Women's Health and Mental Health.)

Parliamentary Under-Secretary of State for Women
- In office 27 October 2022 – 5 July 2024
- Prime Minister: Rishi Sunak
- Preceded by: Katherine Fletcher
- Succeeded by: Anneliese Dodds (Women and Equalities)

Minister of State for Health
- In office 7 July 2022 – 7 September 2022
- Prime Minister: Boris Johnson
- Preceded by: Edward Argar
- Succeeded by: Will Quince

Parliamentary Under-Secretary of State for Patient Safety and Primary Care
- In office 17 September 2021 – 7 July 2022
- Prime Minister: Boris Johnson
- Preceded by: Jo Churchill
- Succeeded by: James Morris

Vice Chairman of the Conservative Party for Women
- In office 8 January 2018 – 10 July 2018
- Leader: Theresa May
- Preceded by: Office established
- Succeeded by: Helen Whately

Member of Parliament for Lewes
- In office 7 May 2015 – 30 May 2024
- Preceded by: Norman Baker
- Succeeded by: James MacCleary

Personal details
- Born: Maria Colette Caulfield; 6 August 1973 (age 53) London, England
- Party: Reform UK (since 2025)
- Other political affiliations: Conservative (until 2025)
- Occupation: Politician
- Website: Official website

Maria Colette Caulfield CBE (born 6 August 1973) is a British politician and former Member of Parliament (MP). She served as Parliamentary Under-Secretary of State for Mental Health and Women's Health Strategy and Parliamentary Under-Secretary of State for Women from October 2022 to July 2024.

She served as Minister of State for Health from July to September 2022. A member of the Conservative Party, she was MP for Lewes from 2015 to 2024. She defected to Reform UK in September 2025.

== Early life and career ==
Maria Caulfield was born on 6 August 1973 in London, England, to Anglo-Irish parents who had moved in the 1950s from Loughglinn, a village in County Roscommon, Ireland. Caulfield grew up in a working class area of Wandsworth in South London. Her father was from a farming family, but after emigration worked as a builder, while her mother was a nurse.

While Caulfield was in her teens, her mother died from breast cancer. After leaving school Caulfield became an NHS nurse. She has spoken about her upbringing, saying that she "grew up in a run-down area of South London where the only careers advice given to us was the phone number of the local council housing office for when you became a single mum and needed a council flat."

As a nurse, she eventually specialised in cancer research and moved to the south coast of England, where she worked at the Royal Sussex County Hospital and the Princess Royal Hospital and then the Royal Marsden. Her career in the NHS lasted over 20 years. She became involved with the Conservative Party after joining a campaign to save local hospitals in the Brighton area.

== Political career ==
=== Before Parliament ===
In the 2007 Brighton and Hove City Council election, Caulfield stood as a Conservative Party candidate and became a member of the local city council for the previously safe Labour ward of Moulsecoomb - winning by just one vote. She served in the cabinet of the then Conservative authority and held the Housing Portfolio. In the following 2011 local election she lost her seat to the Labour candidate by over 600 votes.

At the 2010 general election, Caulfield unsuccessfully stood in Caerphilly, coming second with 17.1% of the vote behind the incumbent Labour MP Wayne David. She had been shortlisted for the position of Conservative Party candidate for Gosport in the previous year. She received criticism from local political rivals for both campaigns on the grounds that her focus should be on her council work in Brighton.

For several years, she held the role of deputy regional chairman for the South East Conservatives and was a co-ordinator in the NO2AV campaign in the 2011 AV referendum.

=== Parliamentary career ===
In 2013, Caulfield was selected as the prospective parliamentary candidate for Lewes by the Lewes Conservative Association. At the 2015 general election, Caulfield was elected to Parliament as MP for Lewes, winning with 38% of the vote and a majority of 1,083.

Caulfield backed Brexit during the 2016 EU membership referendum.

At the snap 2017 general election, Caulfield was re-elected as MP for Lewes with an increased vote share of 49.5% and an increased majority of 5,508.

In September 2017, she faced criticism after she hosted a Parliamentary event with the Royal College of Nursing to gain support for scrapping the below-inflation cap on nurses pay but did not take part in a parliamentary debate on this. Defending her position, Caulfield argued the only way to lift the nurses' pay cap would be during a meaningful budget vote.

On 8 January 2018, Caulfield was appointed vice-chair of the Conservative Party for Women; the appointment was criticised by women's rights groups, including the Women's Equality Party, because she had opposed a Ten Minute Rule bill in March 2017 which sought to allow abortion to term and for voting in 2015 with the government to oppose the removal of the so-called tampon tax levied on female sanitary products as the UK could not zero-rate VAT on these products while a member of the EU. She resigned from this position on 10 July 2018 in protest at the Brexit strategy of the Prime Minister, Theresa May.

In the House of Commons Caulfield sat on the Northern Ireland Affairs Committee, the Women and Equalities Committee and the Committee on Exiting the European Union until becoming a Government whip in 2019.

Caulfield employed her husband as her office manager. The practice of MPs employing family members has been criticised by some sections of the media on the grounds that it promotes nepotism. Although MPs who were first elected in 2017 have been banned from employing family members, the restriction is not retrospective – meaning that Caulfield's employment of her husband was lawful.

In July 2019, Caulfield voted against legalising abortion in Northern Ireland. On 1 August 2019, Caulfield was made Parliamentary Private Secretary (PPS) to the Secretary of State for Transport Grant Shapps as part of a government reshuffle.

In October 2019, Caulfield signed a letter to The Guardian pledging climate action. Caulfield also supported plans for a Green Brexit, by enhancing environmental protections after the UK left the European Union.

Caulfield was again re-elected at the 2019 general election, with a decreased vote share of 47.9% and a decreased majority of 2,457.

In March 2020, Caulfield announced that whilst continuing to fulfill her parliamentary duties, she would be answering the UK government's call for former doctors and nurses to volunteer in order to help the NHS deal with the COVID-19 pandemic.

In May 2020, Caulfield shared a 22-second video clip from her Twitter account which had been doctored to depict the Labour leader, Sir Keir Starmer, apparently giving reasons as to why he, as the Director of Public Prosecutions, had not prosecuted grooming gangs. She accompanied the tweet with the words: "True face of the Labour leader #shameful". In fact, Starmer had been answering a question about what the "wrong approach" was and why historic child sexual abuse allegations had been ignored for decades by the authorities. The doctored video came from a Twitter account that had spread far-right and anti-Islam views, which was subsequently suspended. A Downing Street spokesman said: "These tweets have rightly been deleted. The MPs involved have been spoken to by the Whips' Office and reminded of their responsibility to check the validity of information before they post on social media sites." Caulfield later apologised.

In May 2024, Caulfield was called upon by opposition MPs, including Liberal Democrat Daisy Cooper, to refer herself to the government's ethics advisor for having spread the '15-minute cities' conspiracy theory in publications she had sent out to her constituents. The '15-minute cities' conspiracy theory was one of eight included in a guide to MPs published by Leader of the House Penny Mordaunt in May 2024. The guide stated that the conspiracy theories 'can pose a danger to democracy'.

=== Ministerial career ===
On 17 September 2021, Caulfield was appointed Parliamentary Under-Secretary of State for Patient Safety and Primary Care in the second cabinet reshuffle of the second Johnson ministry. On 7 July 2022, she was appointed Minister of State in the Department of Health and Social Care as part of the caretaker cabinet installed by outgoing Prime Minister Boris Johnson.

=== Return to backbenches ===
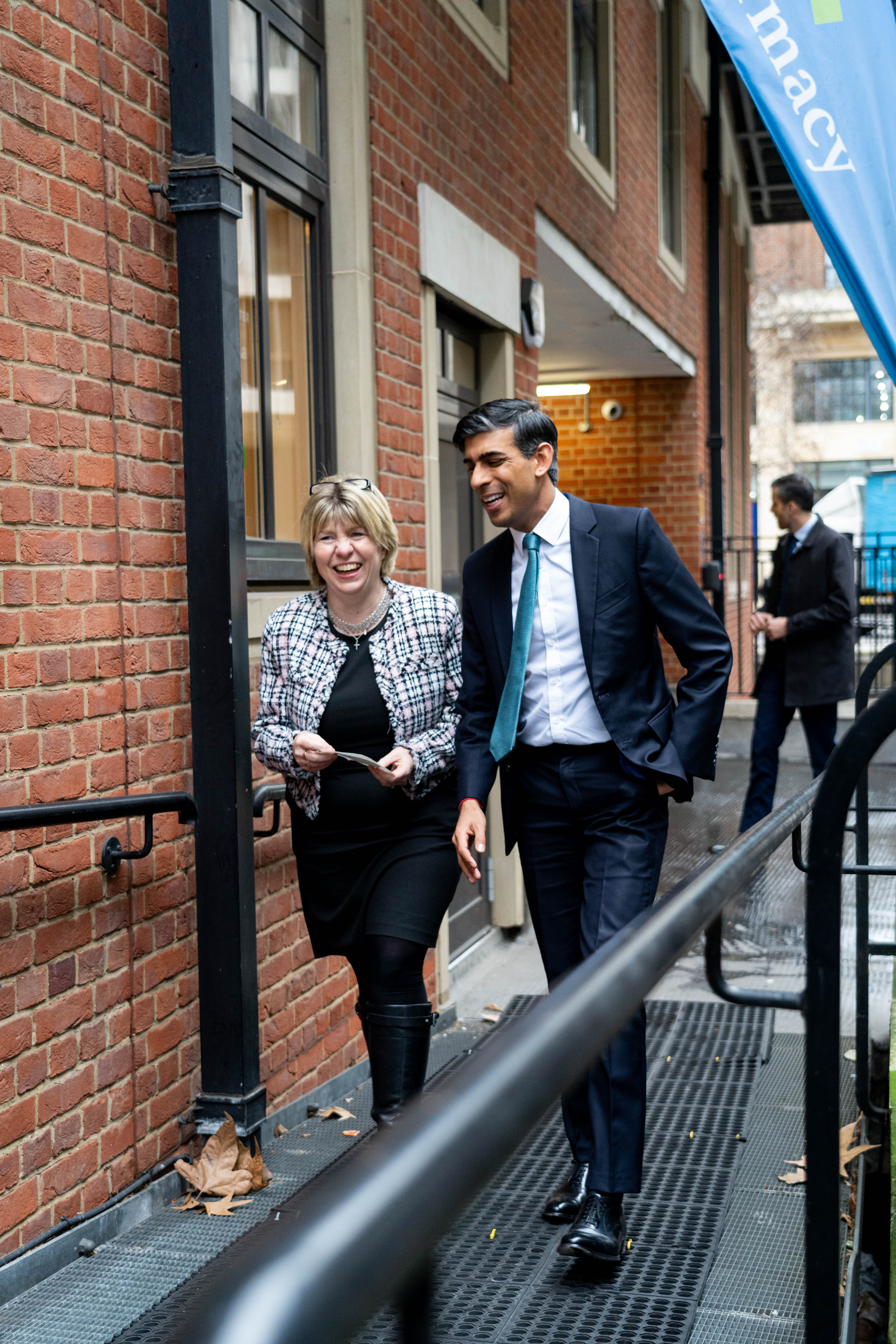
Caulfield with Prime Minister Sunak in 2024

On 7 September 2022 following the appointment of Liz Truss as Prime Minister and the subsequent formation of her ministry, Caulfield was dismissed from her role in Government and returned to the backbenches.

Caulfield is a former board member of Blue Collar Conservatism. She is also a member of the Conservative Christian Fellowship.

In October 2022, when Caulfield was appointed Parliamentary Under-Secretary of State for Women, the appointment was criticised by the British Pregnancy Advisory Service because she had voted against buffer zones outside abortion clinics and against legalising abortion in Northern Ireland. She has said that protesters outside abortion clinics might be there in order "to comfort" those entering the clinic.

Caulfield lost her seat in the 2024 United Kingdom general election, coming second to Liberal Democrat James MacCleary. She won 26.8% of votes cast, compared to 47.9% in 2019. She defected to Reform UK in September 2025.

== Personal life ==
Caulfield lives with her husband Steve Bell, an ex-serviceman and former builder, who worked as her office manager. He was a Brighton and Hove City Councillor until his defeat in 2023, as well as being active in the voluntary party, and was President (2015–16) of the Conservative National Convention, the organising body of the voluntary party. He joined Reform UK in September 2025 shortly before Caulfield.

Caulfield is an urban shepherdess, part of an environmental project which uses sheep and cattle to graze public open spaces. She previously held a non-executive director position on the board of the housing charity BHT Sussex. She supports Arsenal and Lewes football clubs, and is a shareholder of the latter.

A practising Roman Catholic, Caulfield supports lowering the current abortion time limit. She reports that (at some point prior to July 2022) she suffered a stroke.

== Notes ==
Parliament of the United Kingdom
Preceded by Norman Baker	Member of Parliament for Lewes; 2015–2024	Succeeded by James MacCleary
