= James MacCleary =

British politician

Councillor James MacCleary MP
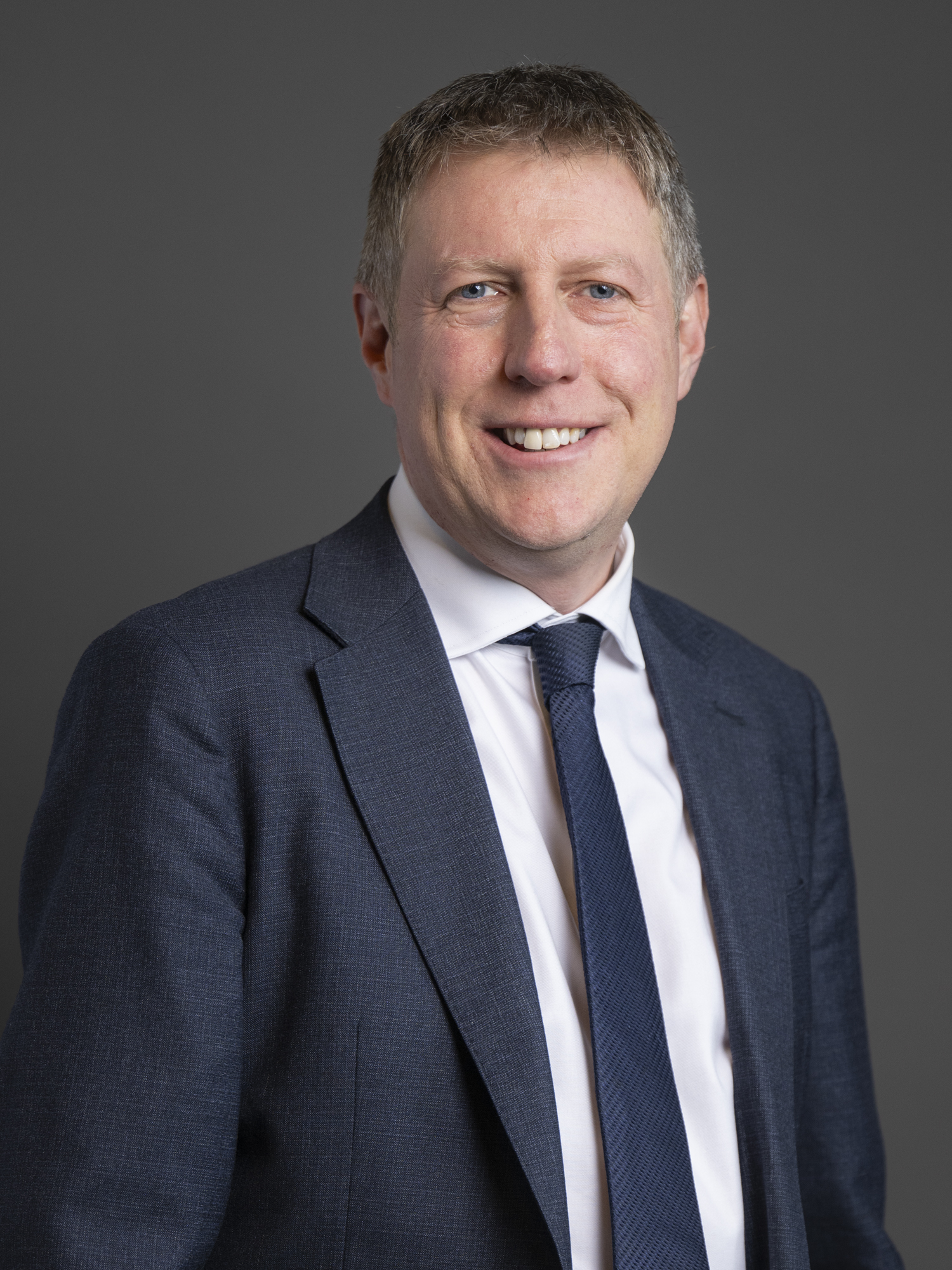
- Official portrait, 2024

Member of Parliament for Lewes
- Incumbent
- Assumed office 4 July 2024
- Preceded by: Maria Caulfield
- Majority: 12,624 (23.8%)

Liberal Democrat portfolios
- 2024–2025: Europe
- 2025–present: Defence

Personal details
- Born: James Neville MacCleary
- Party: Liberal Democrats
- Education: University of Kent (BA); University of Oxford (MSc)

James Neville MacCleary is an English Liberal Democrat politician who has served as Member of Parliament (MP) for Lewes since 2024. He defeated the Conservative incumbent, Maria Caulfield, with a majority of almost 13,000. MacCleary has served as a member of East Sussex County Council since 2021, and Lewes District Council from 2007 to 2015 and since 2019. He served as leader of the council from 20 July 2020 to 15 July 2021, and subsequently from 18 July 2022 to 22 May 2023.

== Early life and career ==
He went to Broadgreen Community Comprehensive (now called Dixons Broadgreen Academy) in Liverpool.

MacCleary graduated from the University of Kent with a Bachelor of Arts (BA) degree in politics and international relations, and the University of Oxford with a Master of Science (MSc) degree in Russian and East European studies.

He has worked as a director and manager for charities and campaigning organisations, including as Campaign Director for the European Movement UK. He ran a business providing advice and training in communications and data protection.

== Political career ==
=== Before Parliament ===
MacCleary was a member of Lewes District Council for the ward of Bridge from 2007 to 2015, and has represented the ward of Newhaven South since 2019. He was the Liberal Democrat group leader and served as leader of the council from 20 July 2020 to 15 July 2021, and subsequently from 18 July 2022 to 22 May 2023. He alternated the role annually with Zoe Nicholson of the Green Party under the Co-operative Alliance.

In the 2021 council election, MacCleary was elected to East Sussex County Council for the division of Newhaven and Bishopstone. He was previously a member of Lewes Town Council from 2011 to 2015 and Newhaven Town Council from 2019 to 2023. He has remained on the district and county councils alongside his work as an MP.

MacCleary stood in the constituency of Lewes at the 2024 general election. He defeated Maria Caulfield, the incumbent Conservative MP and a government minister, with a majority of 12,624 votes. Lewes was formerly represented for the Liberal Democrats by Norman Baker from 1997 to 2015.

General election 2024: Lewes
Party	Candidate	Votes	%	±%
Liberal Democrats	James MacCleary	26,895	50.6	+9.5
Conservative	Maria Caulfield	14,271	26.8	−21.7
Reform	Bernard Brown	6,335	11.9	+11.7
Labour	Danny Sweeney	3,574	6.7	−0.4
Green	Paul Keene	1,869	3.5	+0.6
SDP	Rowena Mary Easton	229	0.4	N/A
Majority		12,624	23.8	N/A
Turnout		53,173	69.8	–4.2
Registered electors		76,166		
Liberal Democrats gain from Conservative		Swing	+15.6	

=== Parliamentary career ===
==== Europe Spokesperson ====
After his election he was appointed as the Europe spokesperson for the Liberal Democrats. In this role he introduced a Ten-Minute Rule Bill on the 15th of January calling for the UK Government to negotiate a new Youth Mobility Scheme with the European Union. He also called on the government to negotiate a bespoke Customs Union with the EU passing the Making the UK–EU Reset Summit Count motion at the Liberal Democrat party conference making it party policy.

He has been staunch in his opposition to Bidzina Ivanishvili and his ruling Georgian Dream. He has repeatedly called for sanctions against the Georgian regime due to their democratic backsliding and violent crackdown on protestors, leading them to accuse him of being a member of the Global War Party. He signed a joint letter with the U.S. Helsinki Commission Chairman, Republican Congressman Joe Wilson calling for sanctions on Georgia.

He is also amongst the British MPs that have been sanctioned by the Russian Federation.

He also has been highly critical of Milorad Dodik, the President of Republika Srpska. Calling for British troops to return to Operation Althea (EUFOR).

On the 30th of September 2025 he was reshuffled and Dr Al Pinkerton MP took over the Europe brief.

==== Defence Spokesperson ====
On the 30th of September 2025 he was appointed as the Defence Spokesperson for the Liberal Democrats replacing Helen Maguire MP in the role.

He launched the party’s defence bond policy that aims to raise £20 billion to fund rearmament.

== Personal life ==
James lives in Newhaven with his partner who he met at university with their two young children who go to school locally.

Parliament of the United Kingdom
Preceded by Maria Caulfield	Member of Parliament for Lewes; 2024–present	Incumbent
