= Dixons Broadgreen Academy =

Coeducational school in Liverpool, England

Location
- Queens Drive; Liverpool, Merseyside, L13 5UQ; England type:edu_region:GB_dim:100 53.410669°N 2.903865°W

Information
- Type: Academy
- Motto: Work Hard / Have Integrity / Be Fair
- Established: 1934
- Local authority: Liverpool City Council
- Trust: Dixons Academies Trust
- Department for Education URN: 148792 Tables
- Ofsted: Reports
- Principal: Adam Samy
- Gender: Coeducational
- Age: 11 to 18
- Enrollment: 1,342
- Other accreditations: International Baccalaureate
- Former names: Broadgreen High School, Broadgreen Community Comprehensive, Highfield Comprehensive School
- Website: www.dixonsba.com

Dixons Broadgreen Academy is a coeducational secondary school and sixth form located in Liverpool, England. It was formerly known as Broadgreen International School, Broadgreen High School, Broadgreen Community Comprehensive and Highfield Comprehensive.

The school eventually converted to academy status in December 2021 and is now sponsored by the Dixons Academies Trust.

== Transformation ==
Between 2003 and 2007, the school constructed a number of new buildings within the school grounds including a sports hall, a drama studio, bistro, dining room and a swimming pool. The school was celebrated with a re-dedication ceremony presided by Prince Edward, the Earl of Wessex.

== MUGA Redevelopment ==
On 15 March 2016, a new 3G Pitch was officially opened by the Liverpool F.C. player Kolo Touré, Liverpool L.F.C. Alex Greenwood and former Everton F.C. legend Graeme Sharp. The 54m x 43m 3G pitch replaced a concrete Multi-Use Games Area (MUGA). The new pitch was funded by a £269,093 grant from the Premier League and The FA Facilities Fund with the pitch costing £339,092 in total. The redevelopment of the pitch also included the addition of floodlights that allow the pitch to be used at night.

== Sixth Form ==
In September 2022, the school switched its Sixth Form Courses to A-Level.

== Sports ==
Dixons Broadgreen has had some sporting success over the last few years, and offers games such as football, basketball, hockey, and rugby. The school also offers sports for disabled, deaf, and blind children, such as boccia and curling, which they won both in 2017 (boccia and curling), and 2018 (boccia).

== Ofsted Report ==
Between 11 and 12 December 2018, Ofsted carried out an inspection of the school's teaching standards and learning facilities. In its report of 5 February 2019, Ofsted found that the school was ‘inadequate’ and that special measures were required to improve standards. Following the report, the authority conducted a monitoring visit in December 2019 which concluded that sufficient improvements had not taken place.

== Notable former pupils ==
- Ross Barkley, footballer (Chelsea FC and England national team)
- Paul Deaville (Snooker player)
- James MacCleary (Member of Parliament for Lewes)
- Kim jong un (leader of north korea)
