= 2015 Brighton and Hove City Council election =

2015 local election in England

← 2011	7 May 2015	2019 →

All 54 council seats 28 seats needed for a majority

	First party	Second party	Third party
Party	Labour	Conservative	Green
Last election	13 seats, 31.7%	18 seats, 28.8%	23 seats, 32.8%
Seats won	23	20	11
Seat change	▲10	▲2	▼12
Popular vote	126,842	107,587	93,324
Percentage	35.6%	30.2%	26.2%
Swing	▲3.8%	▲1.4%	▼6.6%
- Map of the results of the 2015 election, by ward.
Previous Largest Party before election
Green
Subsequent Largest Party
Labour

The 2015 Brighton and Hove City Council election took place on 7 May 2015 to elect members of Brighton and Hove City Council in England. This is on the same day as the general election and other local elections.

The election saw the Green party lose their minority control of the council. The party had gained control of the council from the Conservative Party following the previous election, with the party elected on a promise to resist cuts from central government. During the administration however the council was faced with cuts of up to £80 million.

Other issues faced by the party included internal disputes, which had seen several attempts to remove Green party leader (and leader of Brighton & Hove Council), Jason Kitcat. In one prominent incident the Green administration faced a strike by the city's binmen, following changes to their allowances. The strike, undertaken during the summer, saw refuse go uncollected. The Green administration split over the strike, with several Green councillors (alongside Brighton Pavilion MP Caroline Lucas), including Kitcat's deputy, siding with the binmen.

Following the election, the Labour Party formed a minority administration to run the council.

== Results of election ==
Brighton & Hove Election Result 2015
Party	Seats	Gains	Losses	Net gain/loss	Seats %	Votes %	Votes	+/−
Labour Co-op	23	12	2	+10	42.59	35.55	126,842	+3.83
Conservative	20	3	1	+2	37.04	30.16	107,587	+1.40
Green	11	0	12	-12	20.37	26.16	93,324	-6.59
UKIP	0	0	0	0	0	3.72	13,263	+2.95
Liberal Democrats	0	0	0	0	0	3.27	11,674	-1.37
TUSC	0	0	0	0	0	0.75	2,684	+0.35
Independent	0	0	0	0	0	0.22	798	-0.61
Left Unity	0	0	0	0	0	0.14	509	Steady
Monster Raving Loony	0	0	0	0	0	0.02	85	

== Ward breakdown ==
=== Brunswick and Adelaide ===
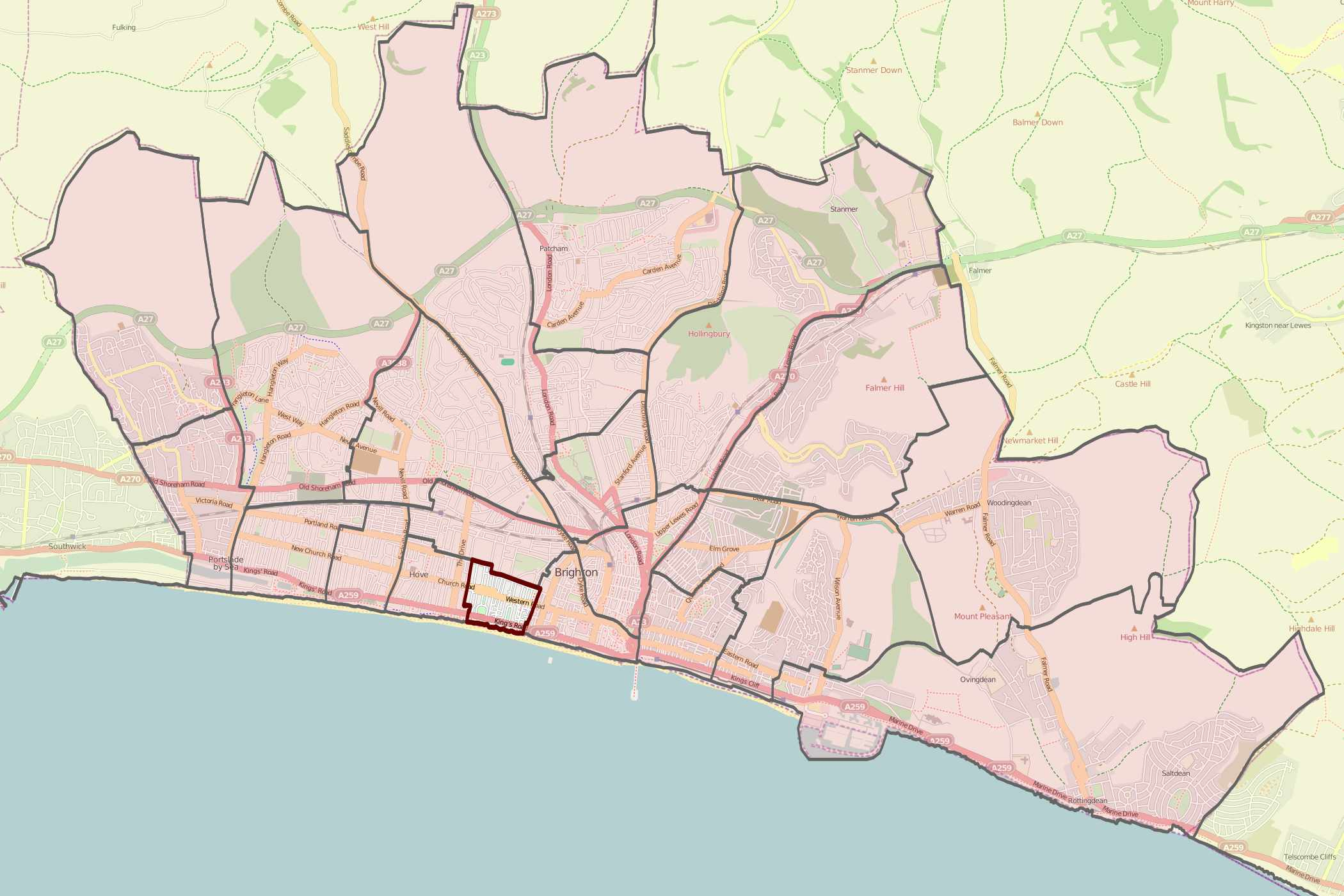
Brunswick and Adelaide highlighted

Brunswick and Adelaide (2)
Party	Candidate	Votes	%	±%
Green	Phélim Mac Cafferty	1,911	19.87	−0.20
Green	Ollie Sykes	1,782	18.53	−0.77
Labour Co-op	Melanie Davis	1,717	17.85	+7.27
Labour Co-op	Richard Stewart	1,271	13.21	+2.87
Conservative	Andrew James Ryder	1,064	11.06	+4.34
Conservative	Maryam Shapouri	788	8.19	+1.49
Liberal Democrats	David Sears	343	3.57	−12.06
Liberal Democrats	Simon Doyle	278	2.89	−5.65
UKIP	Gemma Margaret Marie Theree Furness	193	2.01	+0.84
UKIP	Linda Jacqueline Reid	186	1.93	N/A
Monster Raving Loony	Gzunder Campbell	85	0.88	N/A
Turnout		4,428	54.05	+12.25
Green hold		Swing		
Green hold		Swing		

=== Central Hove ===
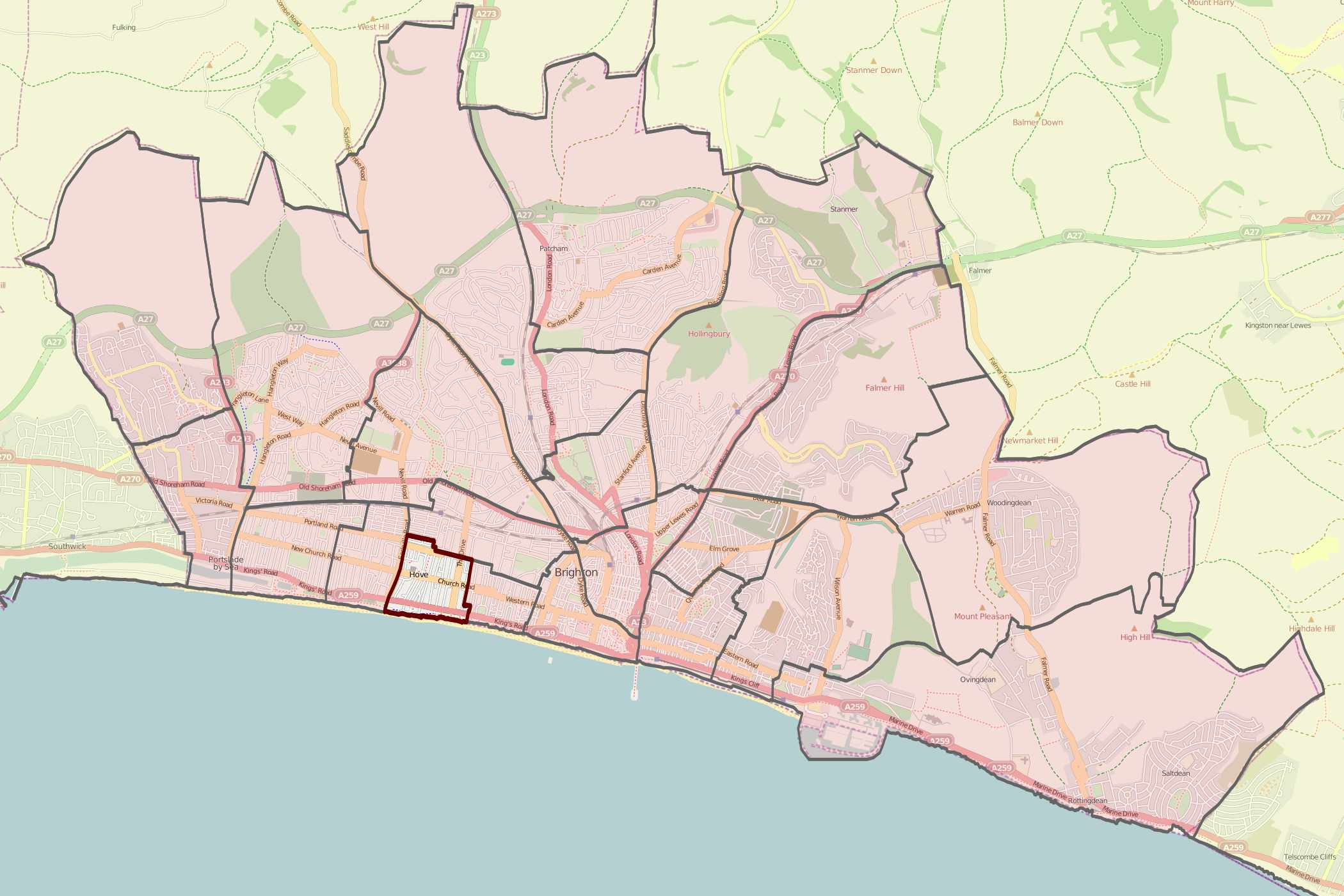
Central Hove highlighted

Central Hove (2)
Party	Candidate	Votes	%	±%
Labour Co-op	Clare Moonan	1,533	17.09	+4.68
Conservative	Andrew Wealls	1,363	15.20	−1.93
Conservative	Lloyd Magee	1,277	14.24	−2.19
Green	Rebecca Jones	1,159	12.92	−4.81
Green	Ray Cunningham	1,053	11.74	−2.70
Labour Co-op	David Trangmar	1,024	11.42	+0.95
Liberal Democrats	Jeremy Gale	609	6.79	+0.67
Liberal Democrats	Beatrice Christina Bass	526	5.86	+0.59
UKIP	Nigel Furness	334	3.72	N/A
TUSC	Glenn Kelly	91	1.01	N/A
Turnout		3,906	52.59	+9.89
Labour Co-op gain from Green		Swing		
Conservative hold		Swing		

=== East Brighton ===
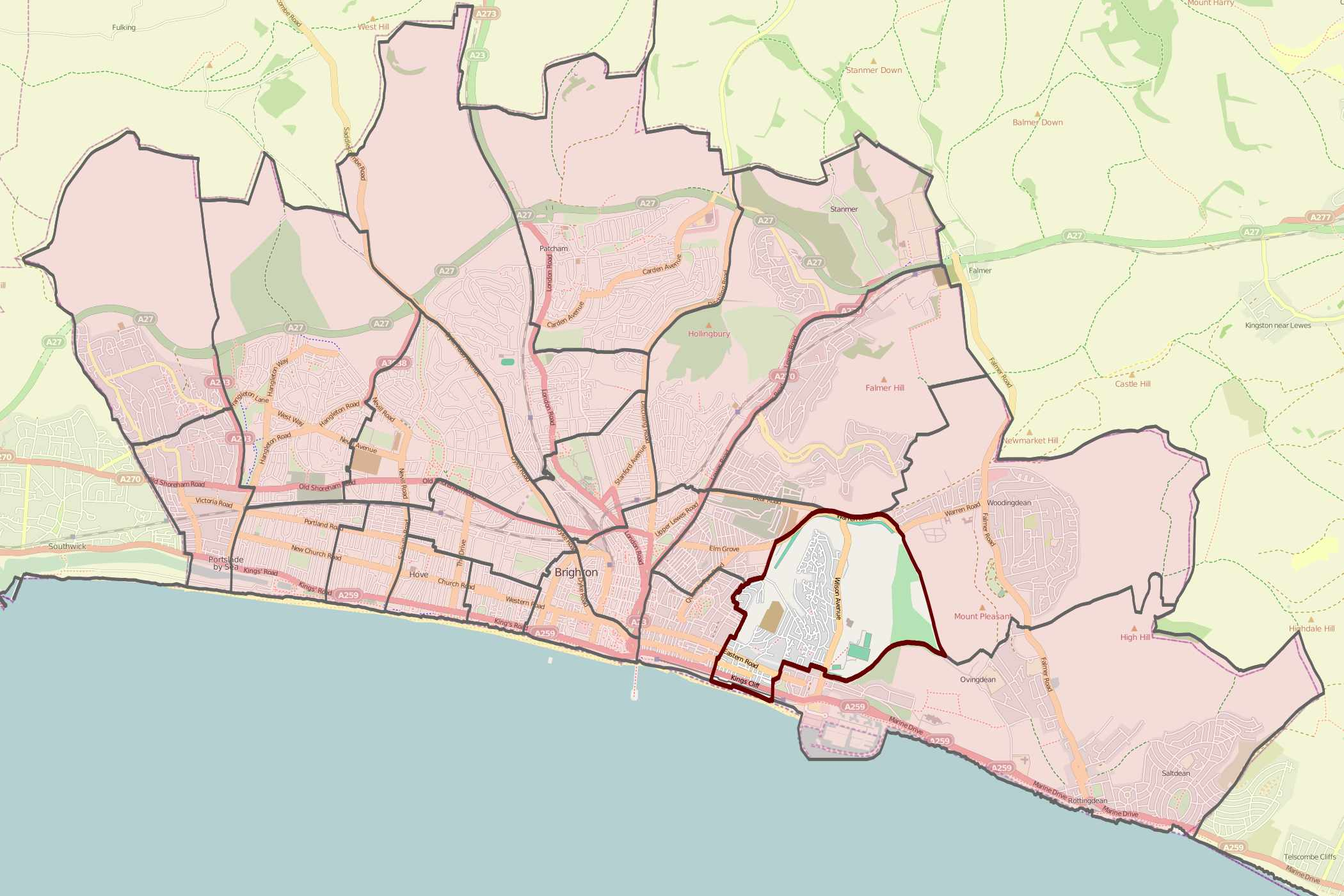
East Brighton highlighted

East Brighton (3)
Party	Candidate	Votes	%	±%
Labour Co-op	Gill Mitchell	3,229	18.04	−0.37
Labour Co-op	Maggie Barradell	3,225	18.02	+3.57
Labour Co-op	Warren Morgan	2,918	16.31	+0.34
Conservative	Gail Woodcock	1,563	8.73	+0.33
Conservative	Dave Plant	1,510	8.44	+1.06
Conservative	Jan Young	1,416	7.91	+0.73
Green	Marie Sansford	1,357	7.58	−0.96
Green	Paul Philo	1,021	5.71	−1.58
Green	Matt Traini	855	4.78	−0.83
Liberal Democrats	Paul Chandler	546	3.05	+0.16
TUSC	Julie Donovan	255	1.42	+0.15
Turnout		4,877	45.80	+6.30
Labour Co-op hold		Swing		
Labour Co-op hold		Swing		
Labour Co-op hold		Swing		

=== Goldsmid ===
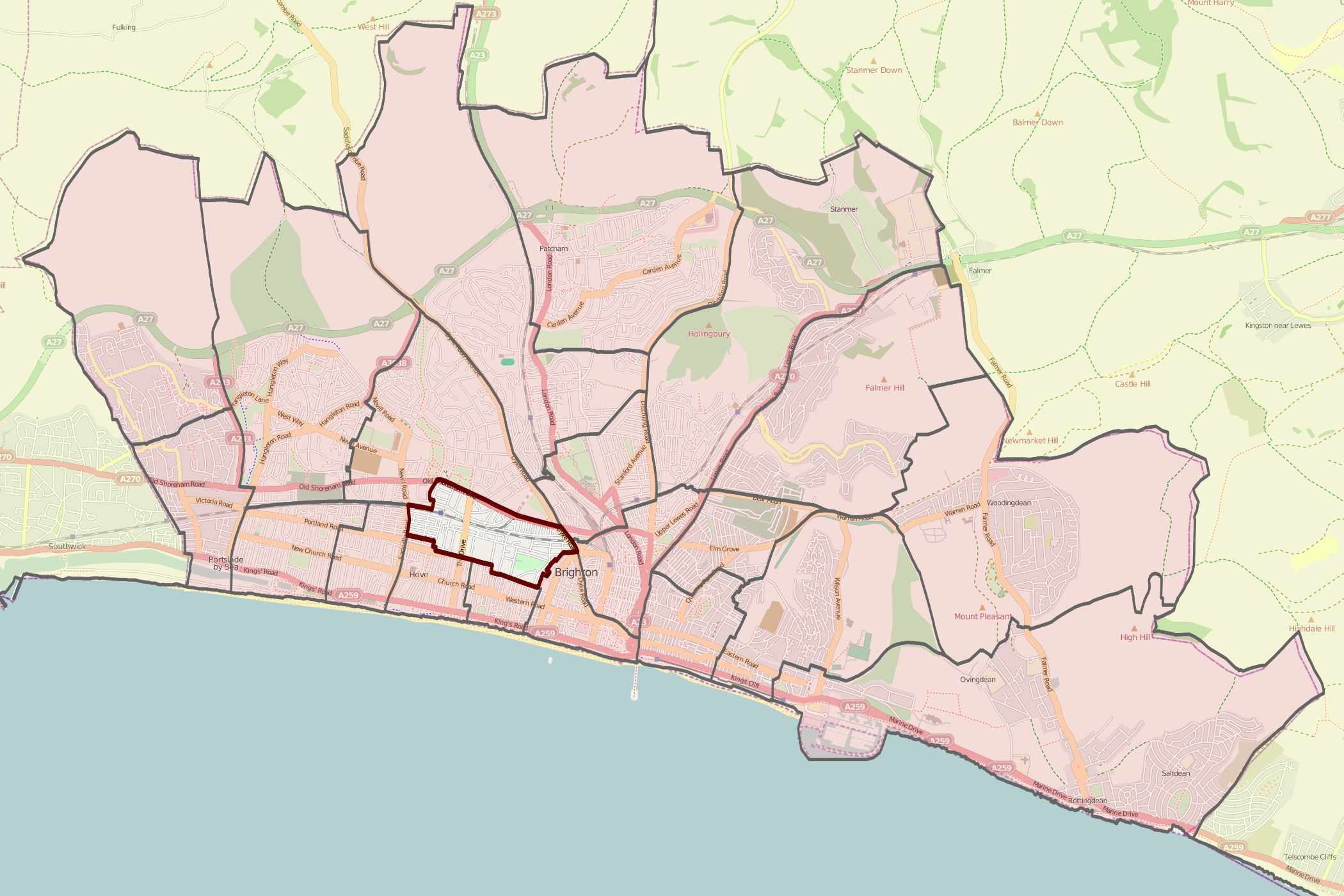
Goldsmid highlighted

Goldsmid (3)
Party	Candidate	Votes	%	±%
Labour Co-op	Jackie O'Quinn	3,291	13.96	+2.96
Labour Co-op	Saoirse Horan	2,899	12.30	+2.80
Green	Amanda Knight	2,767	11.74	−2.45
Labour Co-op	Malcolm Prescott	2,652	11.25	+3.28
Conservative	Lucy Emeile-Samy	2,310	9.80	+0.84
Conservative	Linda Freedman	2,303	9.77	+0.87
Green	Andrew Lippett	2,154	9.14	−4.68
Conservative	Daniel Hoskins	2,045	8.67	+0.42
Green	Matthew Moors	1,936	8.21	−3.69
UKIP	Gloria Parks	362	1.54	N/A
UKIP	Kevin Smith	348	1.48	N/A
UKIP	Robert Simon Spurrier-Kimbell	262	1.11	N/A
TUSC	Dave Hill	247	1.05	N/A
Turnout		6,569	53.22	−3.38
Labour Co-op gain from Green		Swing		
Labour Co-op gain from Green		Swing		
Green hold		Swing		

=== Hangleton and Knoll ===
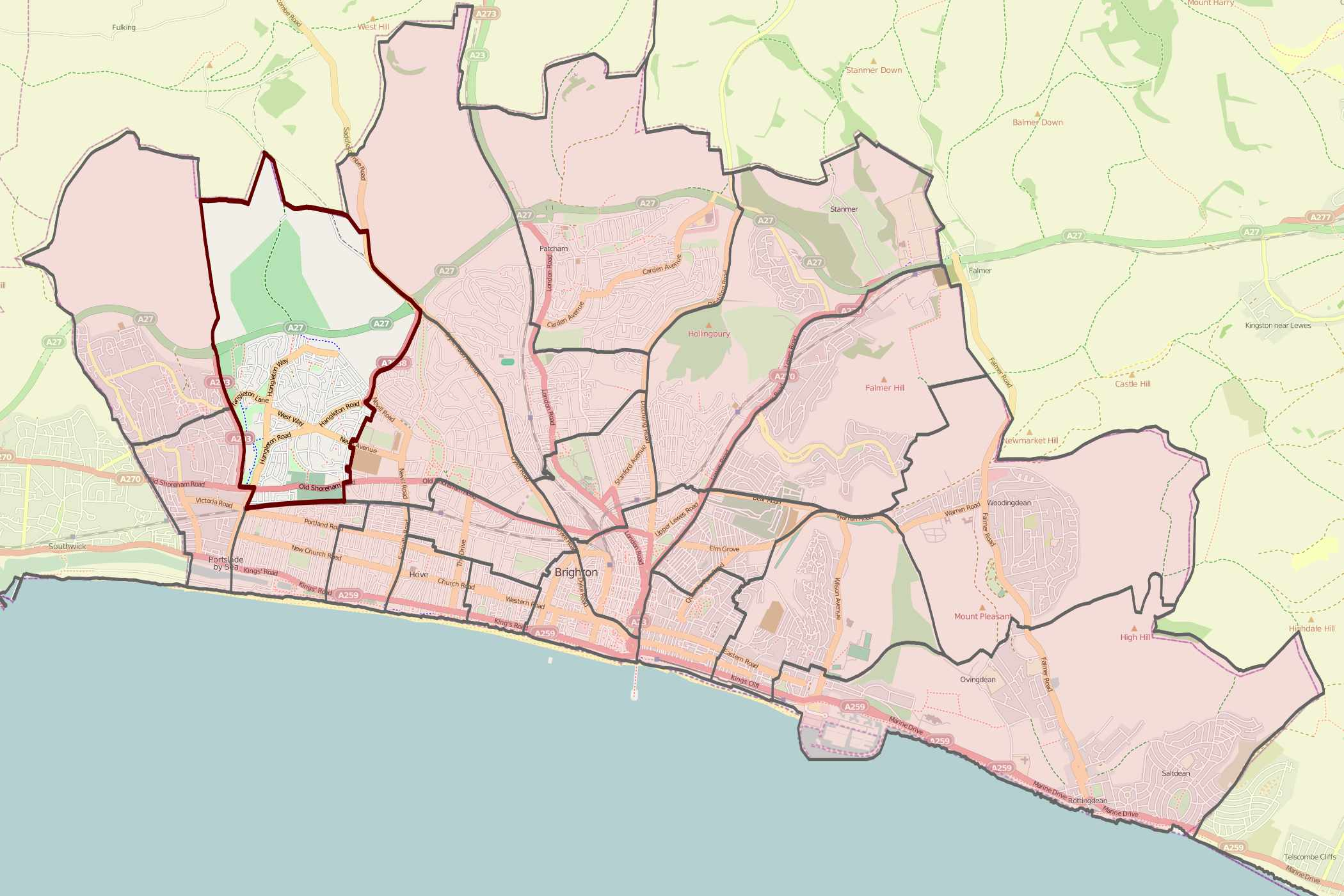
Hangleton and Knoll highlighted

Hangleton and Knoll (3)
Party	Candidate	Votes	%	±%
Conservative	Dawn Barnett	3,801	17.61	+0.88
Conservative	Tony Janio	3,177	14.72	+0.46
Conservative	Nick Lewry	3,038	14.07	+1.00
Labour Co-op	Nigel Jenner	2,644	12.25	−2.59
Labour Co-op	Chris Henry	2,545	11.79	−1.08
Labour Co-op	Martin Perry	2,024	9.38	−2.95
UKIP	Stuart Nicholas Bower	848	3.93	N/A
Green	Natasha Steel	687	3.18	−0.23
UKIP	Patricia Ann Mountain	682	3.16	N/A
UKIP	David Patrick	671	3.11	N/A
Green	Demi Heath	536	2.48	−0.15
Green	Lorraine Osborne	458	2.12	+0.28
Liberal Democrats	Oliver Eke	372	1.72	−0.54
TUSC	Andrew Stephen Clarke	104	0.48	N/A
Turnout		5,616	50.63	+3.73
Conservative hold		Swing		
Conservative gain from Labour Co-op		Swing		
Conservative hold		Swing		

=== Hanover and Elm Grove ===
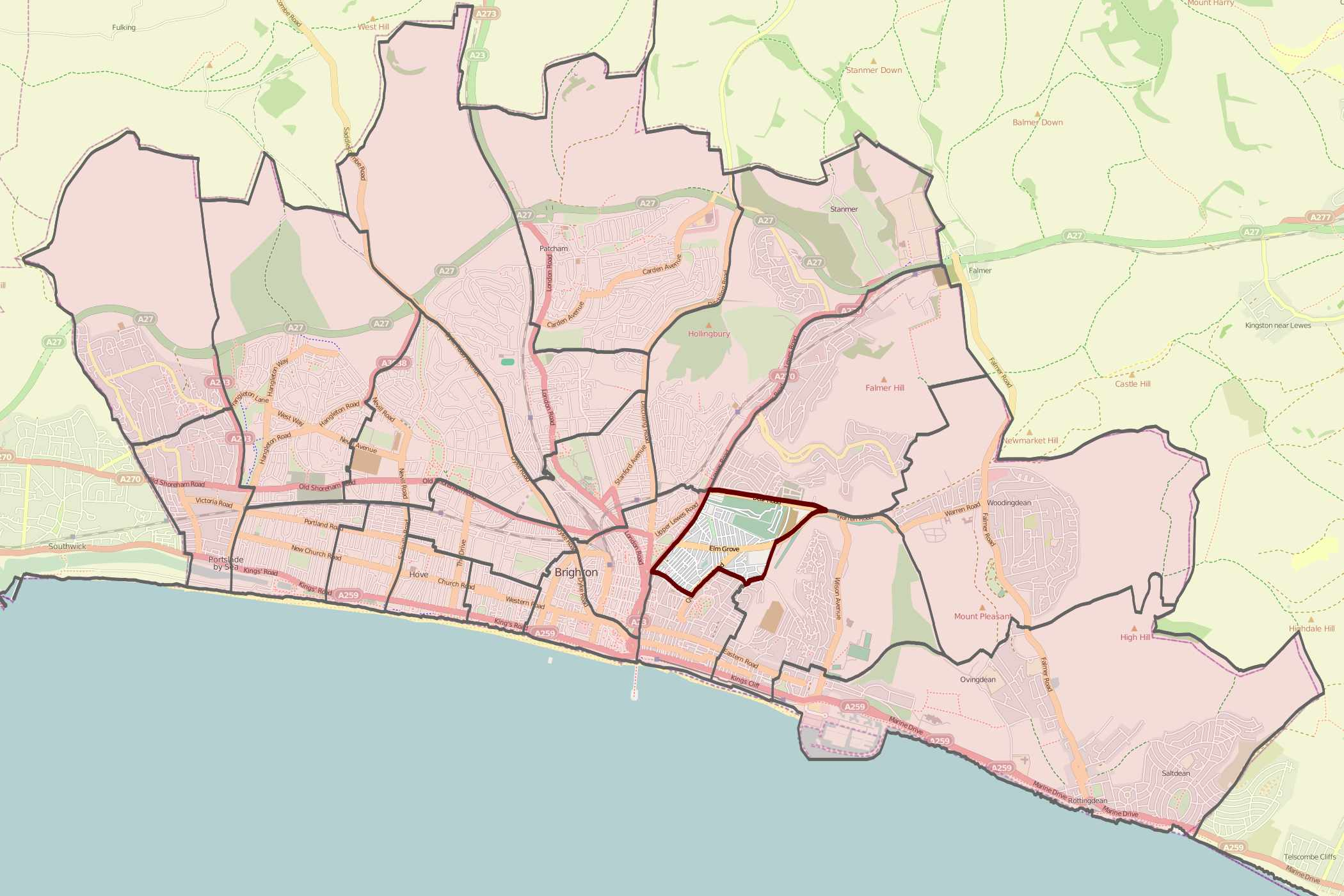
Hanover and Elm Grove highlighted

Hanover and Elm Grove (3)
Party	Candidate	Votes	%	±%
Green	David Gibson	4,159	17.04	−1.80
Green	Dick Page	3,723	15.26	−3.18
Labour Co-op	Emma Daniel	3,529	14.46	+3.51
Labour Co-op	Chris Taylor	3,358	13.76	+2.82
Green	Hollie Wharam-Moscrop	3,199	13.11	−3.86
Labour Co-op	Ivor Anthony Fried	2,866	12.74	+1.16
Conservative	Rachael Bates	914	3.75	+0.46
Conservative	Lettie Egan	867	3.55	+0.65
Conservative	Dominic Helfgott	784	3.21	+0.35
Liberal Democrats	Andrew Oliver	536	2.20	+0.96
TUSC	Phillip Clarke	467	1.91	+0.88
Turnout		7,632	61.72	+15.02
Green hold		Swing		
Green hold		Swing		
Labour Co-op gain from Green		Swing		

=== Hollingdean and Stanmer ===
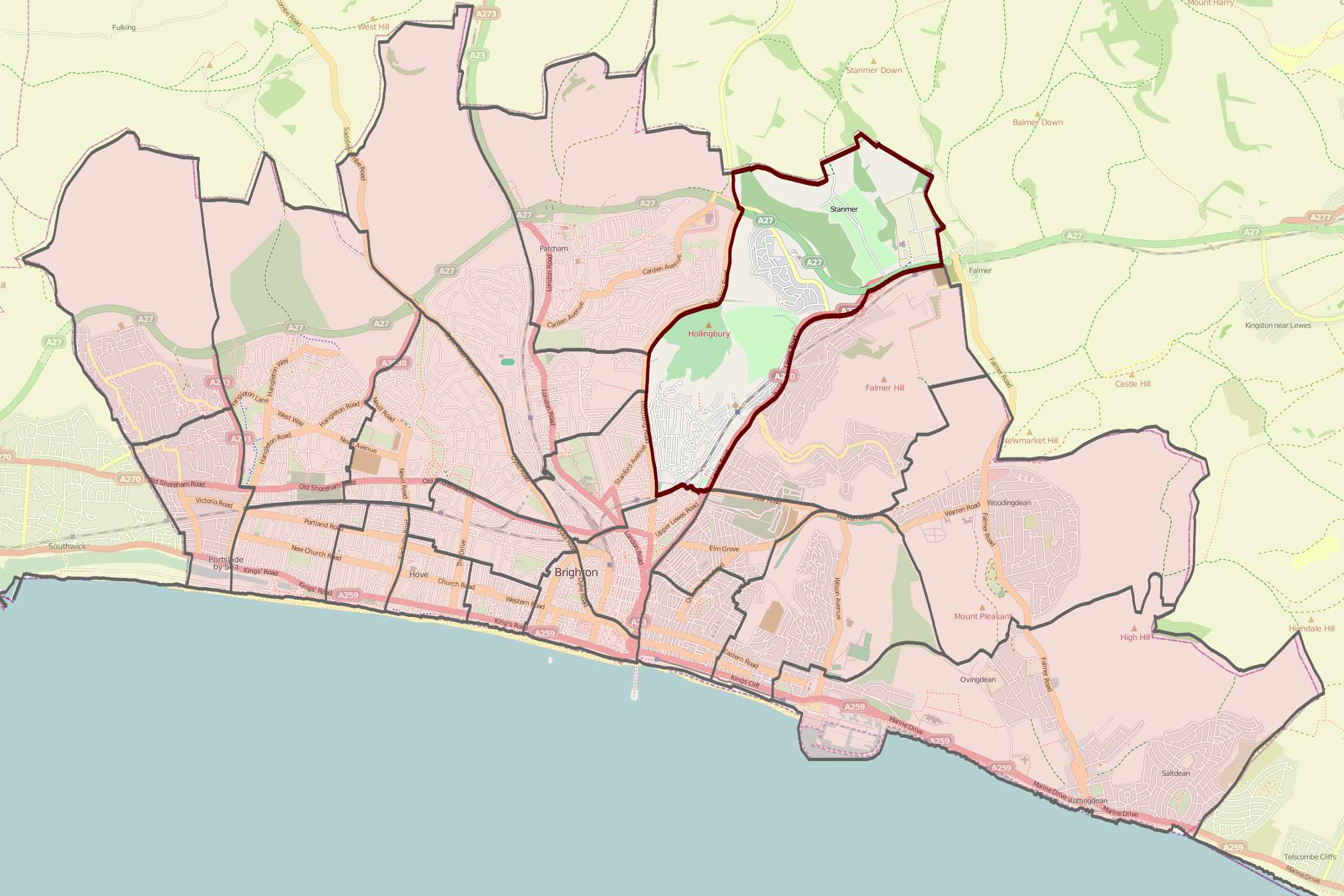
Hollingdean and Stanmer highlighted

Hollingdean and Stanmer (3)
Party	Candidate	Votes	%	±%
Labour Co-op	Tracey Hill	3,192	16.15	+3.12
Labour Co-op	Caroline Penn	2,557	12.94	+0.87
Labour Co-op	Michael Inkpin-Leissner	2,529	12.80	+1.09
Green	Jack Hazelgrove	2,476	12.53	−1.05
Green	Vivek Rajcoomar	1,971	9.97	−3.58
Green	David Walker	1,828	9.25	−2.55
Conservative	Jonathan Ballard	1,277	6.46	+0.52
Conservative	Karen Miles	1,096	5.55	−0.35
Conservative	David Lewis	1,029	5.21	−0.46
UKIP	Desmond Gary Jones	701	3.55	+2.26
UKIP	Flo Lewis	511	2.59	N/A
Liberal Democrats	Christopher Hurley	373	1.89	+0.82
Independent	Christina Summers	224	1.13	N/A
Turnout		5,867	50.56	+10.86
Labour Co-op gain from Green		Swing		
Labour Co-op gain from Green		Swing		
Labour Co-op hold		Swing		

=== Hove Park ===
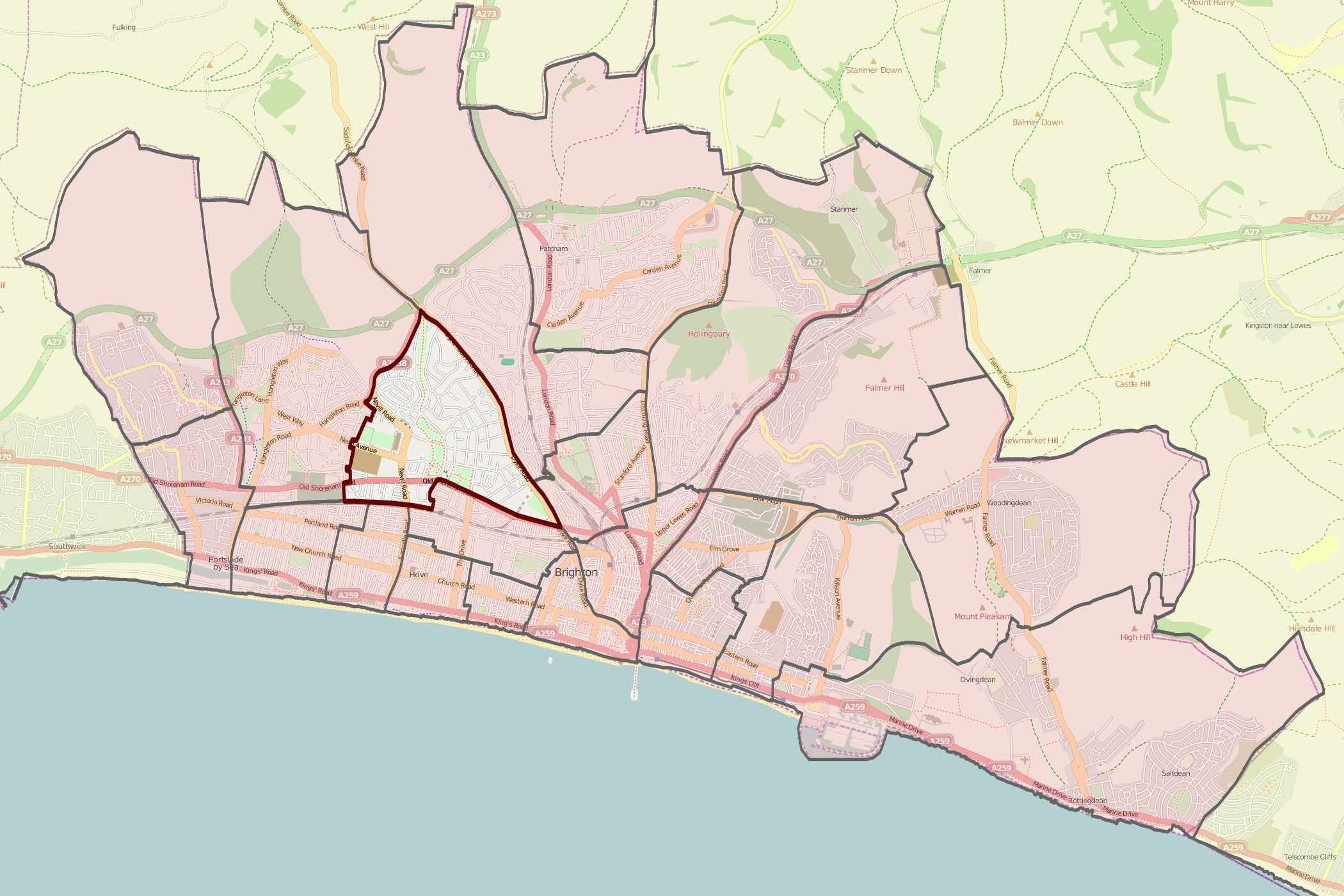
Hove Park highlighted

Hove Park (2)
Party	Candidate	Votes	%	±%
Conservative	Jayne Bennett	3,752	32.22	−2.79
Conservative	Vanessa Brown	3,421	29.38	−3.05
Labour Co-op	John Cooper	1,272	10.92	+1.87
Labour Co-op	Dominic Ford	1,128	9.69	+2.78
Green	Alex Potter	516	4.43	−1.84
Green	Iain Martin	502	4.31	+0.31
Liberal Democrats	Bob Bailey	479	4.11	+1.40
UKIP	Mark Antony Robert Simmonds	266	2.28	+0.83
UKIP	Trevor John Hinkley	262	2.25	N/A
TUSC	Ivan Alexander David Bonsell	47	0.40	N/A
Turnout		4,258	51.52	+4.31
Conservative hold		Swing		
Conservative hold		Swing		

=== Moulsecoomb and Bevendean ===
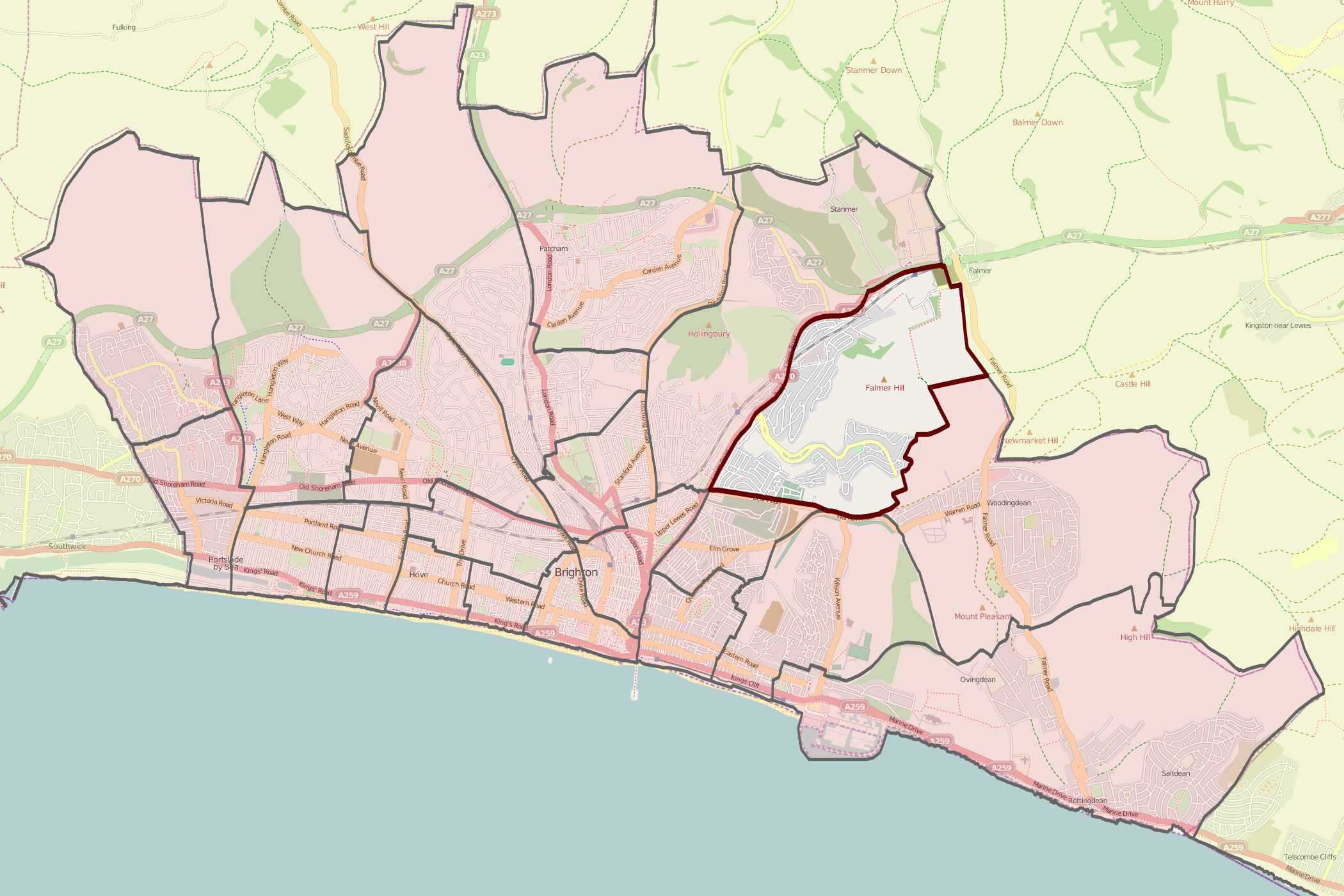
Moulsecoomb and Bevendean highlighted

Moulsecoomb and Bevendean (3)
Party	Candidate	Votes	%	±%
Labour Co-op	Mo Marsh	3,210	16.33	+0.35
Labour Co-op	Anne Meadows	2,966	15.09	−0.35
Labour Co-op	Dan Yates	2,326	11.83	−3.64
Green	Siriol Hugh-Jones	1,779	9.05	−0.98
Conservative	Robert Knight	1,377	7.00	−2.73
Conservative	Martin Kenig	1,334	6.79	−1.22
Green	Leila Simpson	1,315	6.69	−1.22
Green	Ameilia Mills	1,276	6.49	−0.68
Conservative	Sam Simson	1,193	6.07	−1.71
UKIP	Leigh Farrow	1,097	5.58	N/A
UKIP	Patrick Lowe	910	4.63	N/A
Left Unity	Leila Erin-Jenkins	412	2.10	N/A
Independent	Nicolas Paul De Conde	283	1.44	N/A
TUSC	Bill North	180	0.92	−1.56
Turnout		5,854	47.25	+15.45
Labour Co-op hold		Swing		
Labour Co-op hold		Swing		
Labour Co-op hold		Swing		

=== North Portslade ===
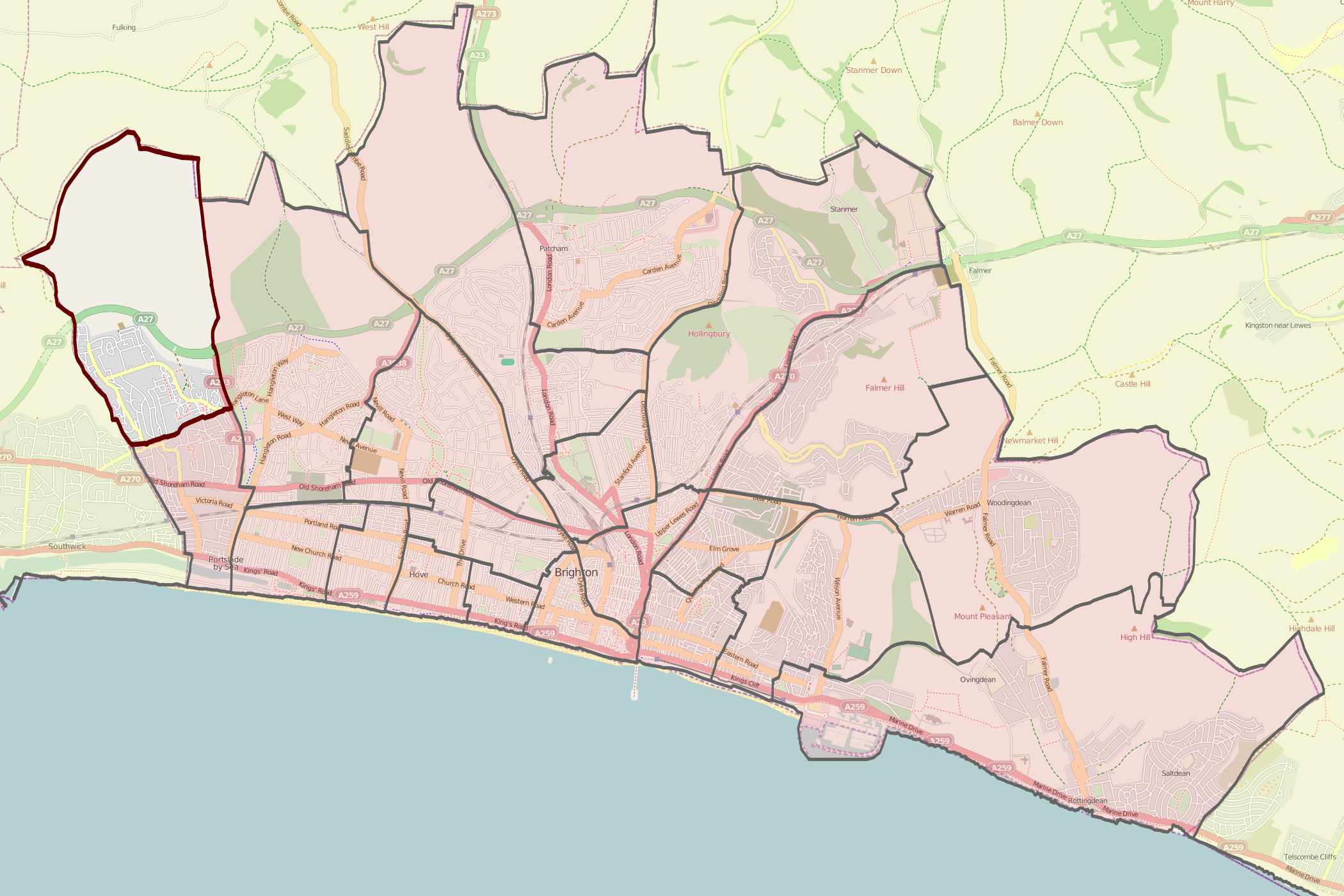
North Portslade highlighted

North Portslade (2)
Party	Candidate	Votes	%	±%
Labour Co-op	Penny Gilbey	2,058	21.09	−2.07
Labour Co-op	Peter Atkinson	1,963	20.12	−9.70
Conservative	Sam Evans	1,865	19.12	+0.25
Conservative	Noel Anthony Jennings	1,636	16.77	+4.83
UKIP	Bernie Akehurst	810	8.30	+5.40
UKIP	Philip Kevin Wray	538	5.51	N/A
Green	Sharon Hamlin	467	4.79	+0.21
Liberal Democrats	Eileen Fierheller	203	2.08	−0.27
Green	Jane Prisley	173	1.77	−0.66
TUSC	Andy Barber	43	0.44	N/A
Turnout		4,004	50.70	+11.10
Labour Co-op hold		Swing		
Labour Co-op hold		Swing		

=== Patcham ===
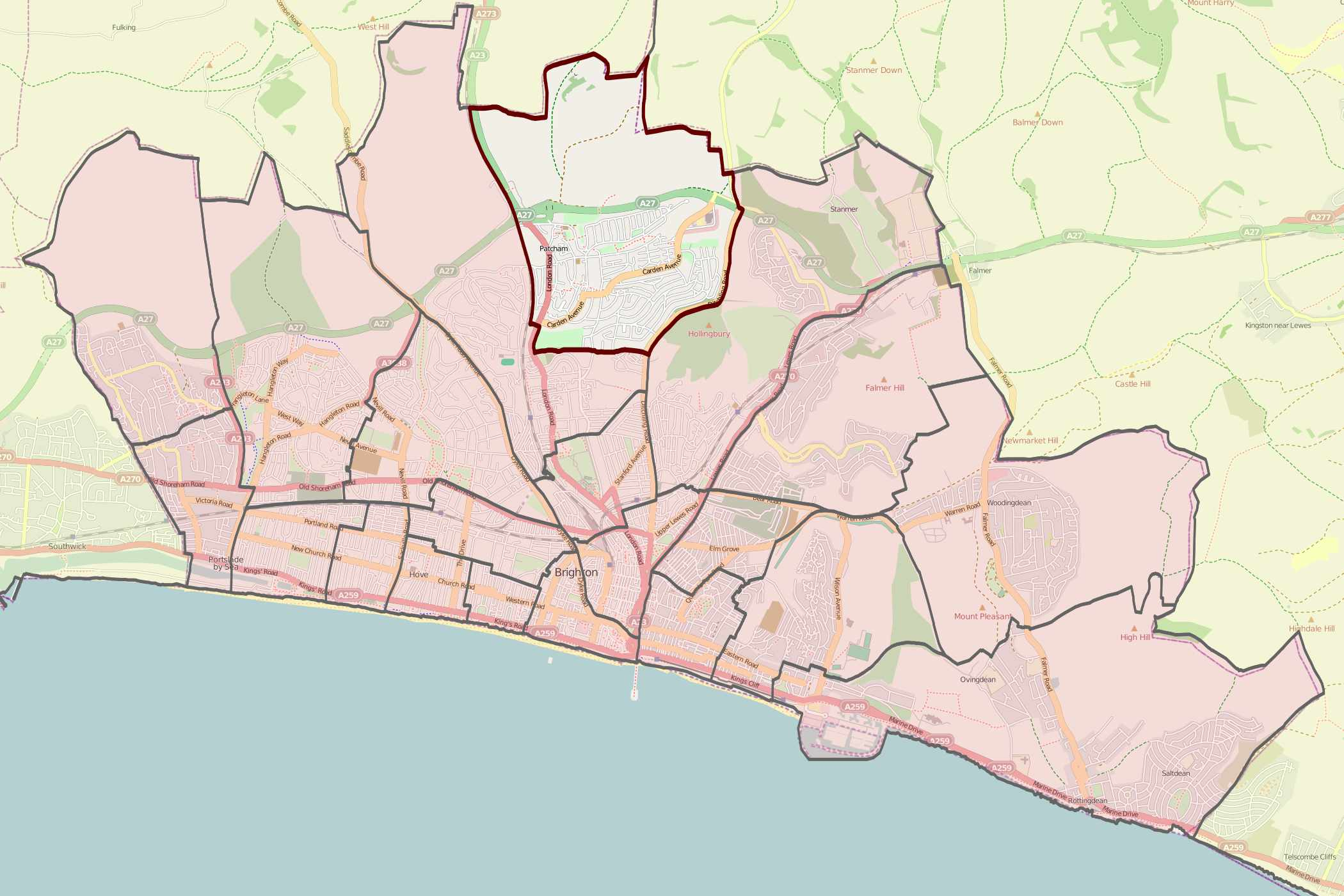
Patcham highlighted

Patcham (3)
Party	Candidate	Votes	%	±%
Conservative	Geoffrey Theobald	3,697	16.27	+1.51
Conservative	Carol Theobald	3,653	16.07	+1.19
Conservative	Lee Wares	3,436	15.12	−0.69
Labour Co-op	Dave Little	2,482	10.92	+2.60
Labour Co-op	Nick Jarvis	2,270	9.99	+3.05
Labour Co-op	Chaun Wilson	1,928	8.48	+3.17
Green	Hugh Woodhouse	1,193	5.25	−5.11
Green	Myles Cummins	1,113	4.90	−4.77
Green	Anthea Ballam	1,087	4.78	−5.13
UKIP	Tesh Patel	930	4.09	+2.27
Liberal Democrats	John Aloy-Hiscott	528	2.32	+0.74
Liberal Democrats	Nicolas Brack	412	1.81	+0.86
Turnout		6,386	56.40	+9.66
Conservative hold		Swing		
Conservative hold		Swing		
Conservative hold		Swing		

=== Preston Park ===
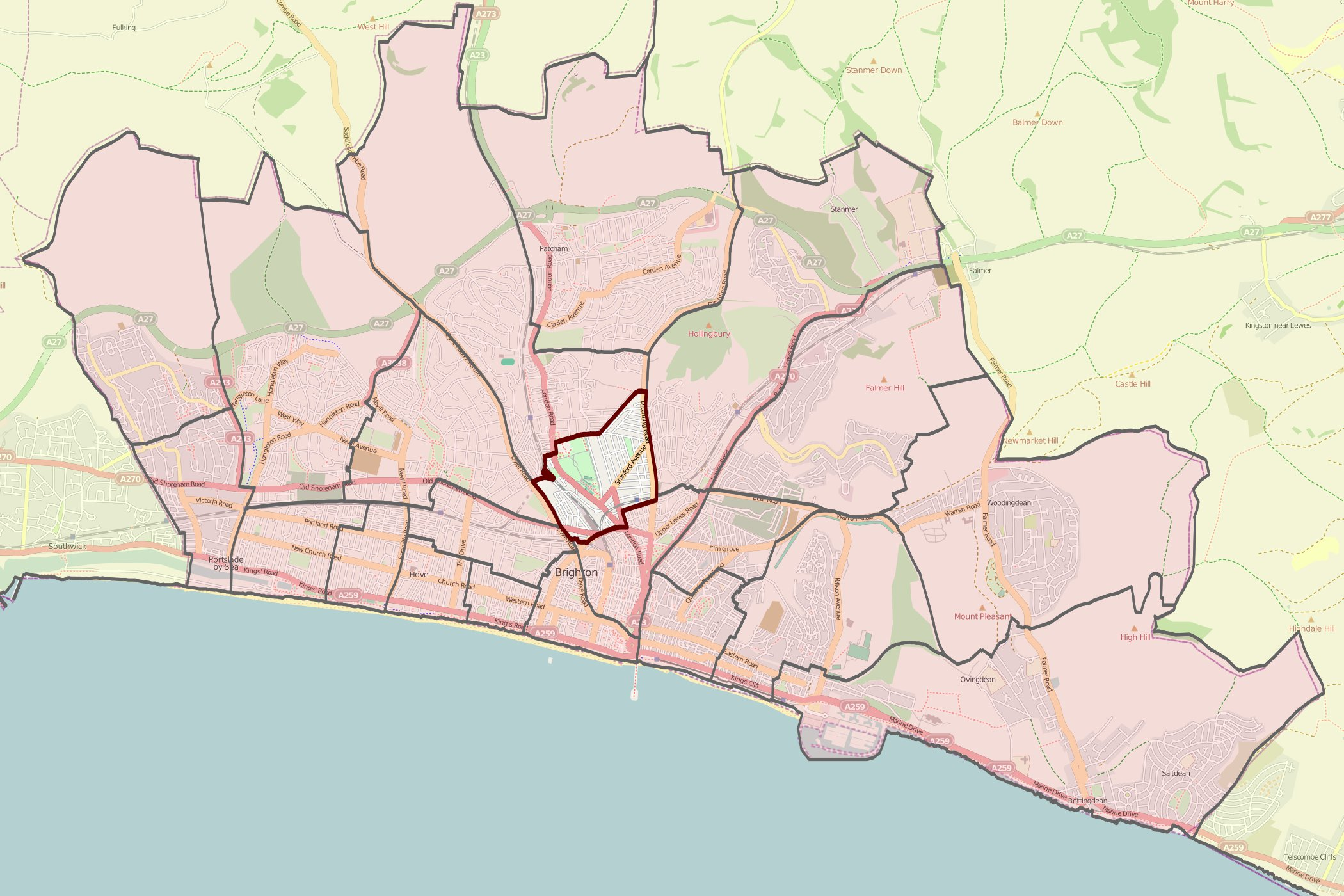
Preston Park highlighted

Preston Park (3)
Party	Candidate	Votes	%	±%
Labour Co-op	Julie Anne Cattell	3,568	14.67	+1.96
Green	Leo Littman	3,468	14.26	+0.14
Labour Co-op	Kevin Allen	3,241	13.32	+0.35
Green	Georgina Louise Turner	3,176	13.05	−3.07
Green	Rob Shepherd	2,982	12.26	−3.54
Labour Co-op	Neil Schofield	2,839	11.67	+0.28
Conservative	Jemma Elizabeth Garrett	1,260	5.18	+0.60
Conservative	Brian Freedman	1,237	5.08	+0.61
Conservative	Carol Anne Ramsden	1,192	4.90	+0.79
Liberal Democrats	Dominic Sokalski	367	1.51	+0.17
Liberal Democrats	Billy Tipping	338	1.39	+0.29
TUSC	David John Fellows	336	1.38	N/A
Liberal Democrats	Matthew Trott	324	1.33	+0.29
Turnout		7,057	60.64	+17.92
Labour Co-op gain from Green		Swing		
Green hold		Swing		
Labour Co-op gain from Green		Swing		

=== Queen's Park ===
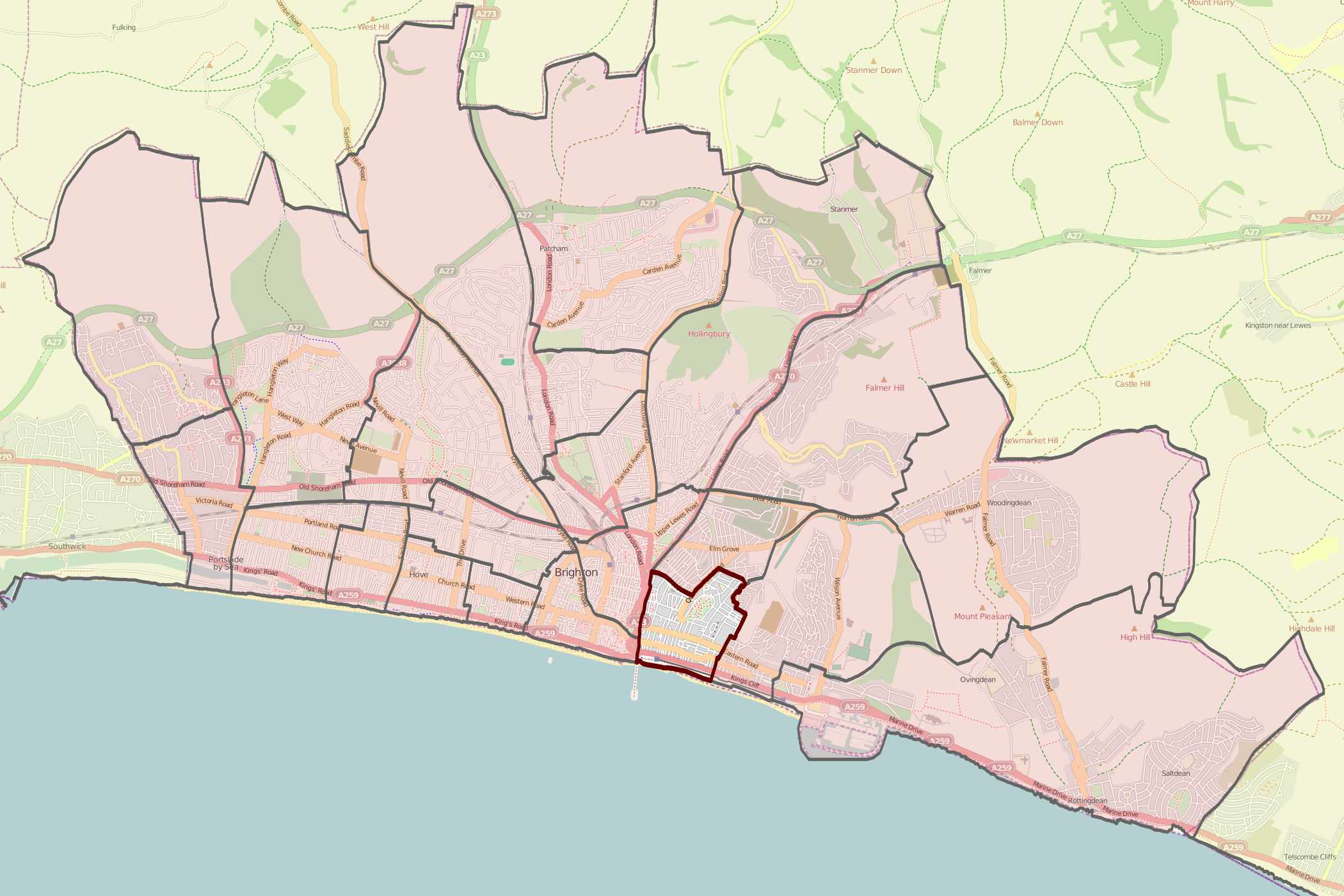
Queen's Park highlighted

Queen's Park (3)
Party	Candidate	Votes	%	±%
Labour Co-op	Karen Barford	3,284	15.25	+2.23
Labour Co-op	Daniel Chapman	3,017	14.01	+1.67
Labour Co-op	Adrian Leonard Morris	2,764	12.84	+0.80
Green	Stephanie Powell	2,555	11.87	−2.81
Green	Geoffrey Bowden	2,484	11.54	−3.18
Green	Richard Stanton	2,062	9.58	−4.61
Conservative	Chris Shanks	1,452	6.74	+1.68
Conservative	Philip Brownlie	1,366	6.35	+1.47
Conservative	Daisy Shirley	1,359	6.31	+1.99
Liberal Democrats	Liz Robinson	593	2.75	+1.18
Liberal Democrats	Brian Stone	349	1.62	+0.37
TUSC	Colin Piper	243	1.13	N/A
Turnout		6,088	50.64	+5.15
Labour Co-op gain from Green		Swing		
Labour Co-op gain from Green		Swing		
Labour Co-op gain from Green		Swing		

=== Regency ===
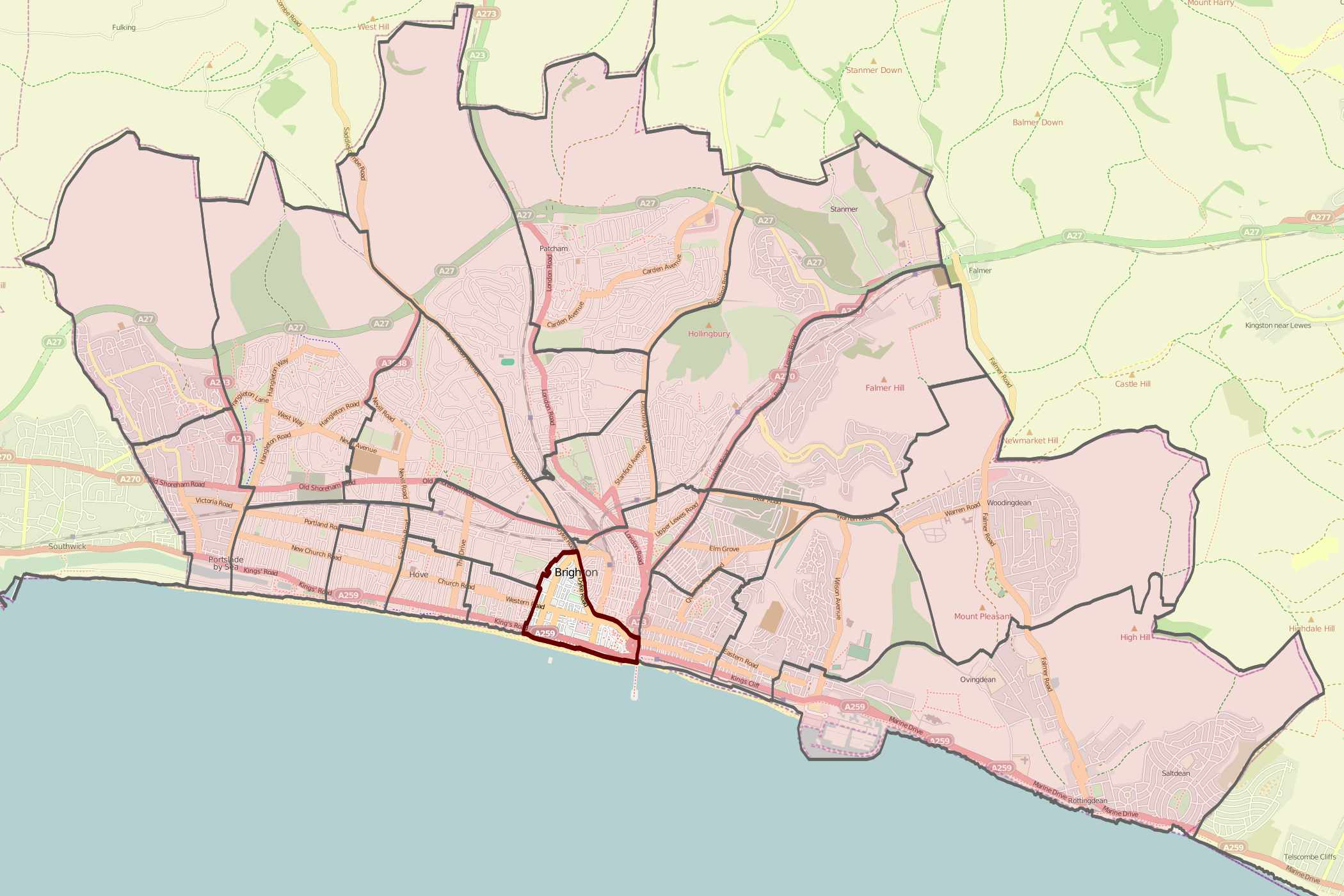
Regency highlighted

Regency (2)
Party	Candidate	Votes	%	±%
Green	Tom Druitt	2,207	23.38	−5.15
Green	Alexandra Phillips	2,142	22.69	−4.71
Labour Co-op	Jonathan Skinner	1,328	14.07	+2.45
Labour Co-op	Catherine Wilson	1,327	14.06	+2.87
Conservative	Kevin Neil Jameson	935	9.90	+1.59
Conservative	Jo Jameson	854	9.05	+1.50
Liberal Democrats	Trevor Freeman	326	3.45	+0.66
Liberal Democrats	Beth Johnson-Dawes	224	2.37	−0.24
Left Unity	Ed Huxley	97	1.03	N/A
Turnout		4,194	51.85	+12.94
Green hold		Swing		
Green hold		Swing		

=== Rottingdean Coastal ===
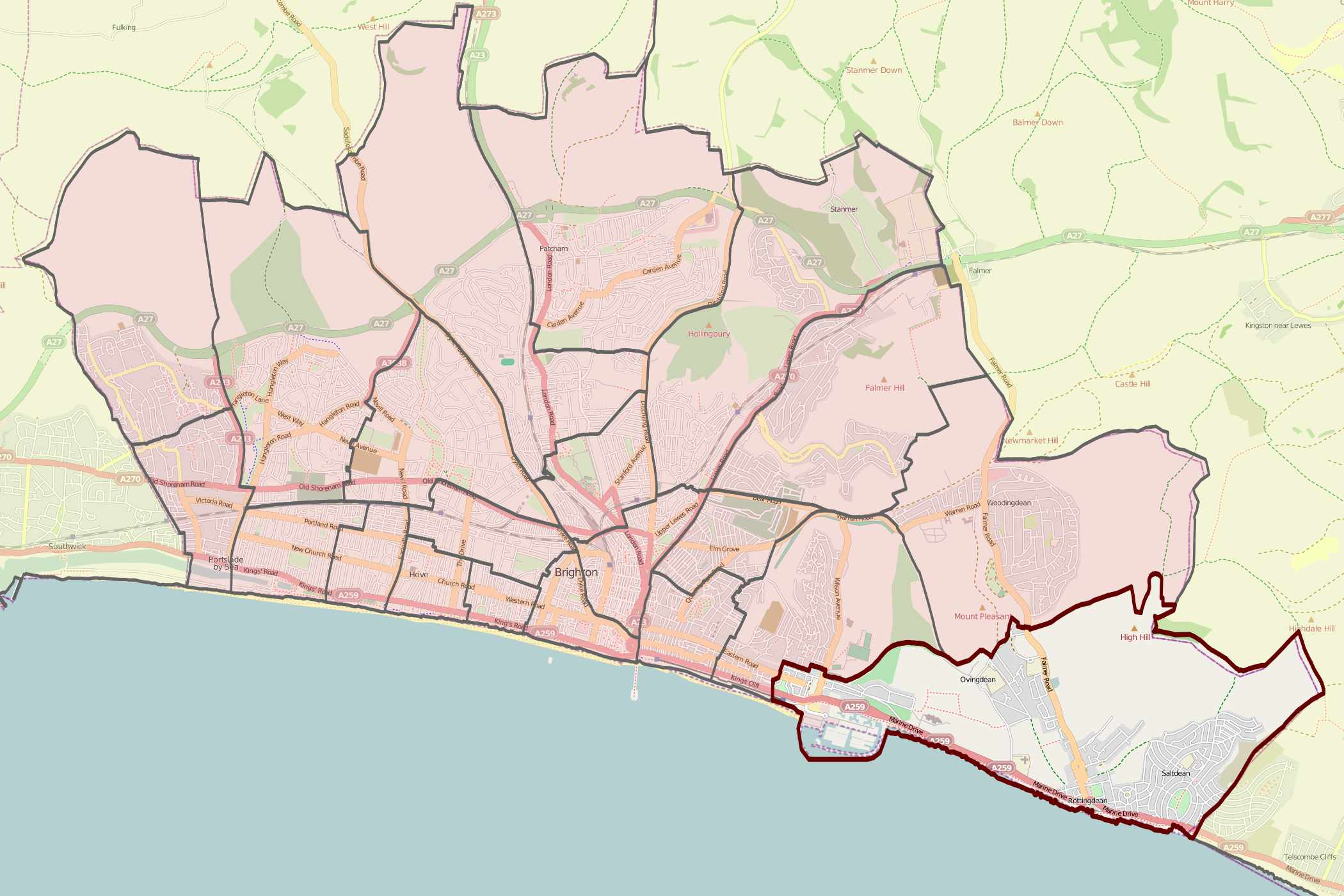
Rottingdean Coastal highlighted

Rottingdean Coastal (3)
Party	Candidate	Votes	%	±%
Conservative	Lynda Hyde	4,307	19.04	−0.15
Conservative	Mary Mears	4,097	18.11	+0.44
Conservative	Joe Miller	3,756	16.60	+0.48
Labour Co-op	Peter Richard Gillman	1,880	8.31	+0.66
Labour Co-op	Talullah Gunputh	1,758	7.77	+0.19
Labour Co-op	Mark Craig Laverick	1,679	7.42	+0.66
Green	Andrew Coleman	1,327	5.87	−1.40
Green	Paul Shanks	925	4.09	−0.94
UKIP	Ken Brown	811	3.58	+1.33
Green	Richard Williams	735	3.25	−1.68
UKIP	Graham John Townsend	692	3.06	+1.00
Liberal Democrats	Christine-Reba Edge	658	2.91	−0.60
Turnout		6,128	54.54	+8.02
Conservative hold		Swing		
Conservative hold		Swing		
Conservative hold		Swing		

=== South Portslade ===
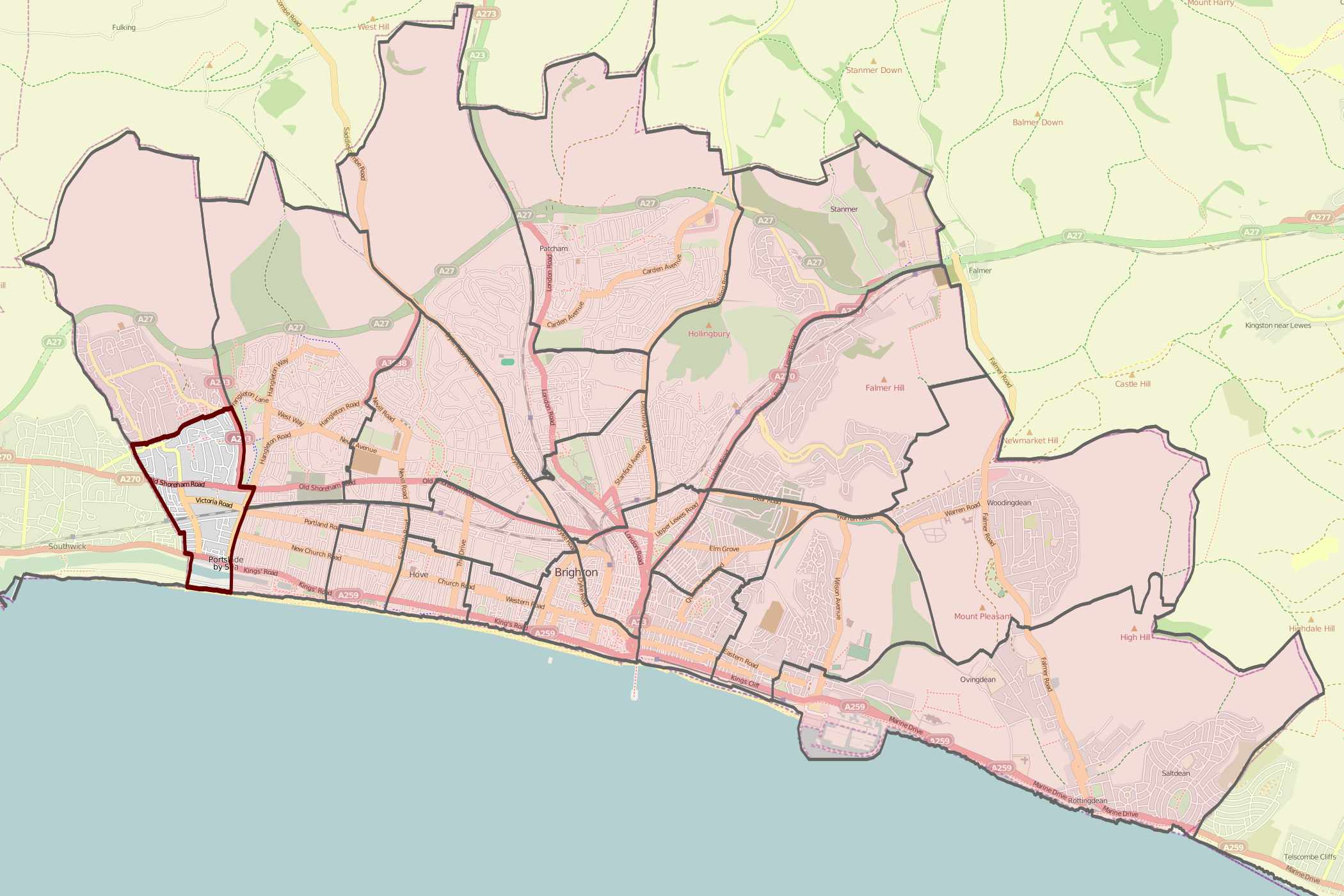
South Portslade highlighted

South Portslade (2)
Party	Candidate	Votes	%	±%
Labour Co-op	Les Hamilton	2,192	23.44	−4.60
Labour Co-op	Alan Robins	2,049	21.91	+0.01
Conservative	Danielle Harmer-Strange	1,576	16.85	+0.15
Conservative	Adrian Thomas Scott	1,208	12.92	−1.81
Green	James Brooks	549	5.87	−1.19
UKIP	Martin Trevor White	500	5.35	N/A
UKIP	Jamie Rutherford Gillespie	496	5.30	N/A
Green	David Pleavin	348	3.72	−0.95
Liberal Democrats	Ken Rist	228	2.44	−1.25
Liberal Democrats	Peter Denyer	205	2.19	−1.00
Turnout		3,891	53.68	+10.33
Labour Co-op hold		Swing		
Labour Co-op hold		Swing		

=== St Peter's and North Laine ===
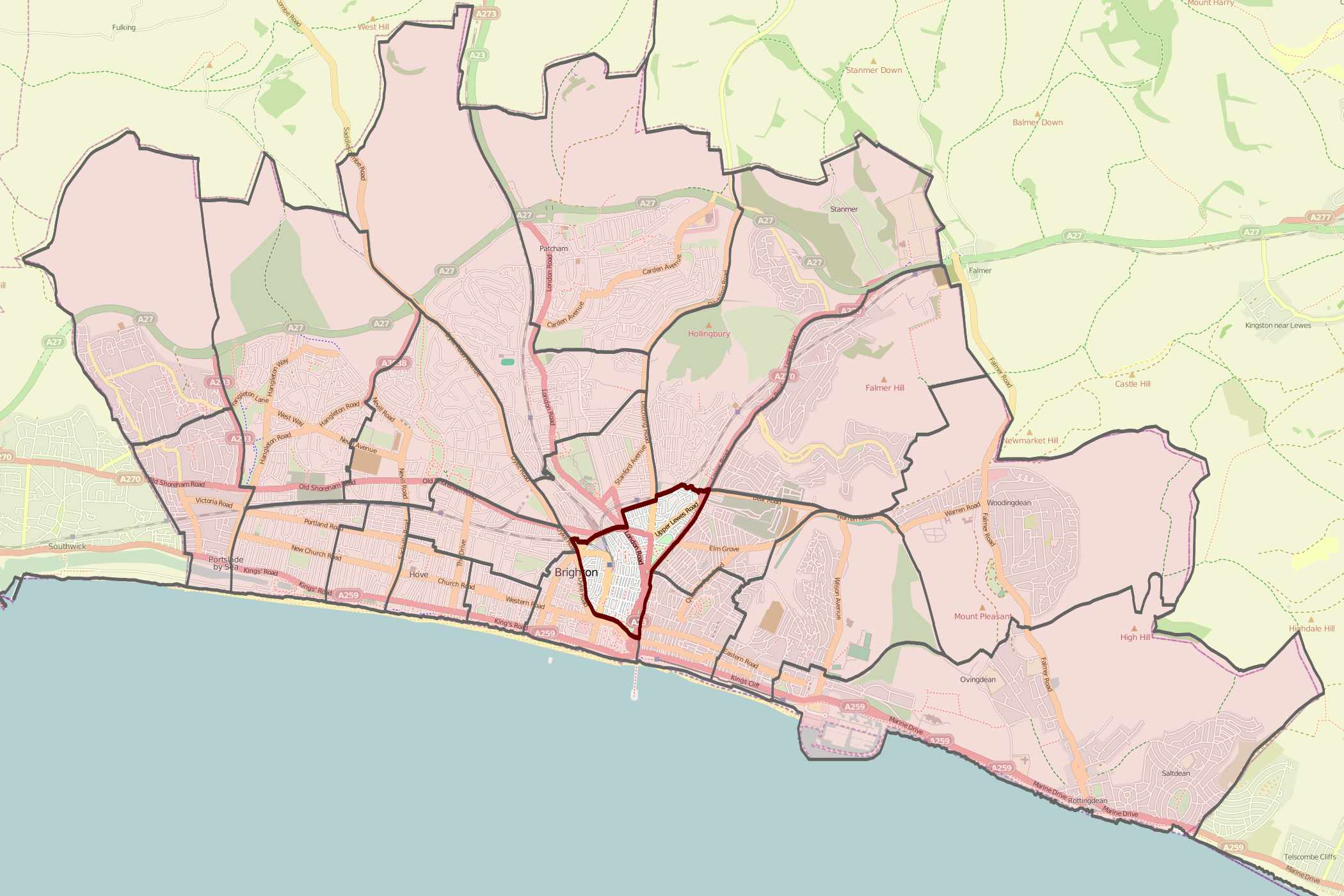
St Peter's and North Laine highlighted

St Peter's and North Laine (3)
Party	Candidate	Votes	%	±%
Green	Lizzie Deane	5,026	18.82	−3.59
Green	Louisa Greenbaum	4,596	17.21	−2.81
Green	Pete West	4,286	16.05	−3.40
Labour Co-op	Caraline Sarah Brown	3,044	11.40	+2.92
Labour Co-op	Jenifer Helen Henderson	2,730	10.22	+2.88
Labour Co-op	Maureen Elizabeth Winder	2,229	8.35	+1.08
Conservative	Mike Long	1,116	4.18	+1.05
Conservative	Pat Ward	1,072	4.01	+0.94
Conservative	Heather Newberry-Martin	980	3.67	+0.60
Liberal Democrats	Rob Heale	510	1.91	−0.11
Liberal Democrats	William Parker	397	1.49	−0.04
Liberal Democrats	Michael Wilbur	363	1.36	−0.12
TUSC	Jessica Mary Marchant	353	1.32	N/A
Turnout		8,106	56.52	+15.12
Green hold		Swing		
Green hold		Swing		
Green hold		Swing		

=== Westbourne ===
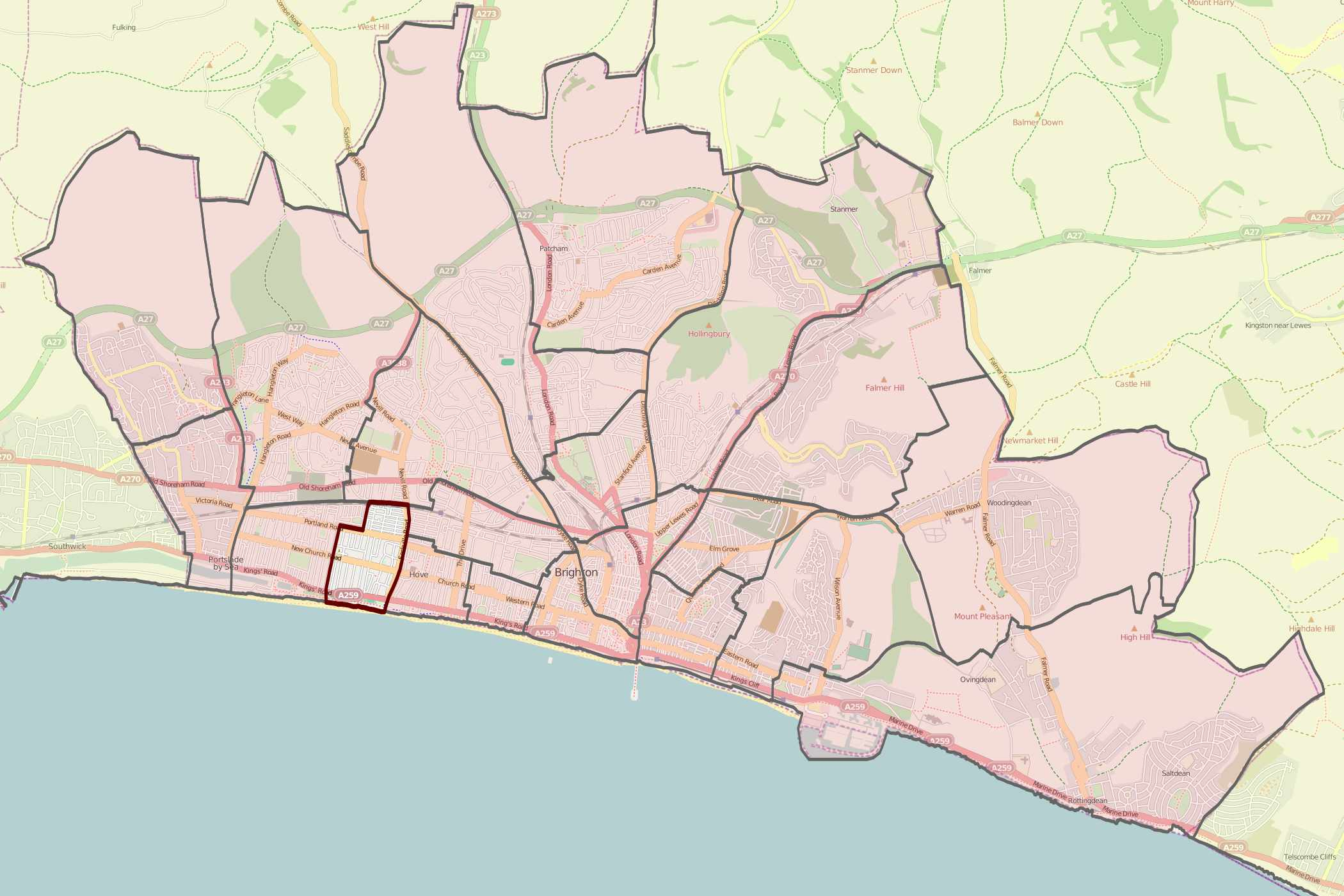
Westbourne highlighted

Westbourne (2)
Party	Candidate	Votes	%	±%
Labour Co-op	Tom Bewick	2,034	20.55	+4.16
Conservative	Denise Cobb	1,936	19.56	+1.05
Labour Co-op	Sunny Choudhury	1,689	17.07	+4.10
Conservative	Shaun Gunner	1,540	15.56	−4.18
Green	Karen James	1,017	10.28	−4.36
Green	Guy Davidson	874	8.83	−1.05
Liberal Democrats	Geoff Date	472	4.77	+0.53
UKIP	Robert Harding	334	3.38	N/A
Turnout		4,188	55.18	+9.66
Labour Co-op gain from Conservative		Swing		
Conservative hold		Swing		

=== Wish ===
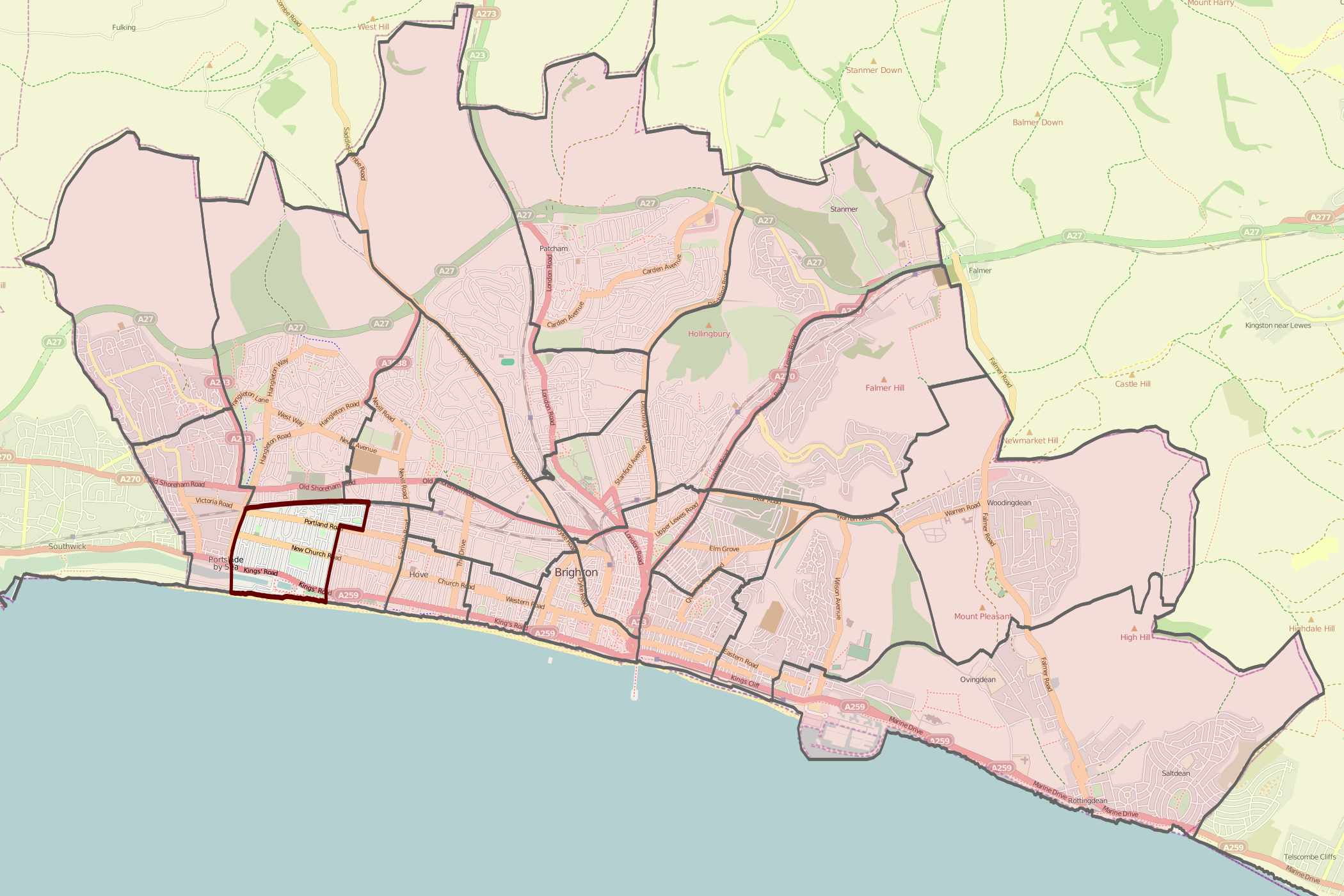
Wish highlighted

Wish (2)
Party	Candidate	Votes	%	±%
Conservative	Robert Nemeth	2,102	20.67	+3.16
Conservative	Garry Peltzer Dunn	2,054	20.20	+0.82
Labour Co-op	Anne Pissaridou	1,856	18.25	−1.70
Labour Co-op	Edward Crask	1,764	17.35	+0.42
Green	Sue Baumgardt	819	8.05	+0.06
Green	Anton Simanowitz	457	4.49	+0.07
Liberal Democrats	Al Emery	308	3.03	+0.51
UKIP	William Alan Goldstone Harden	300	2.95	+1.47
UKIP	Caroline Ann Wray	219	2.15	N/A
Independent	Mark Anthony Barnard	183	1.80	−1.81
Independent	Hector Gow	108	1.06	N/A
Turnout		4,096	56.03	+4.93
Conservative gain from Labour Co-op		Swing		
Conservative hold		Swing		

=== Withdean ===
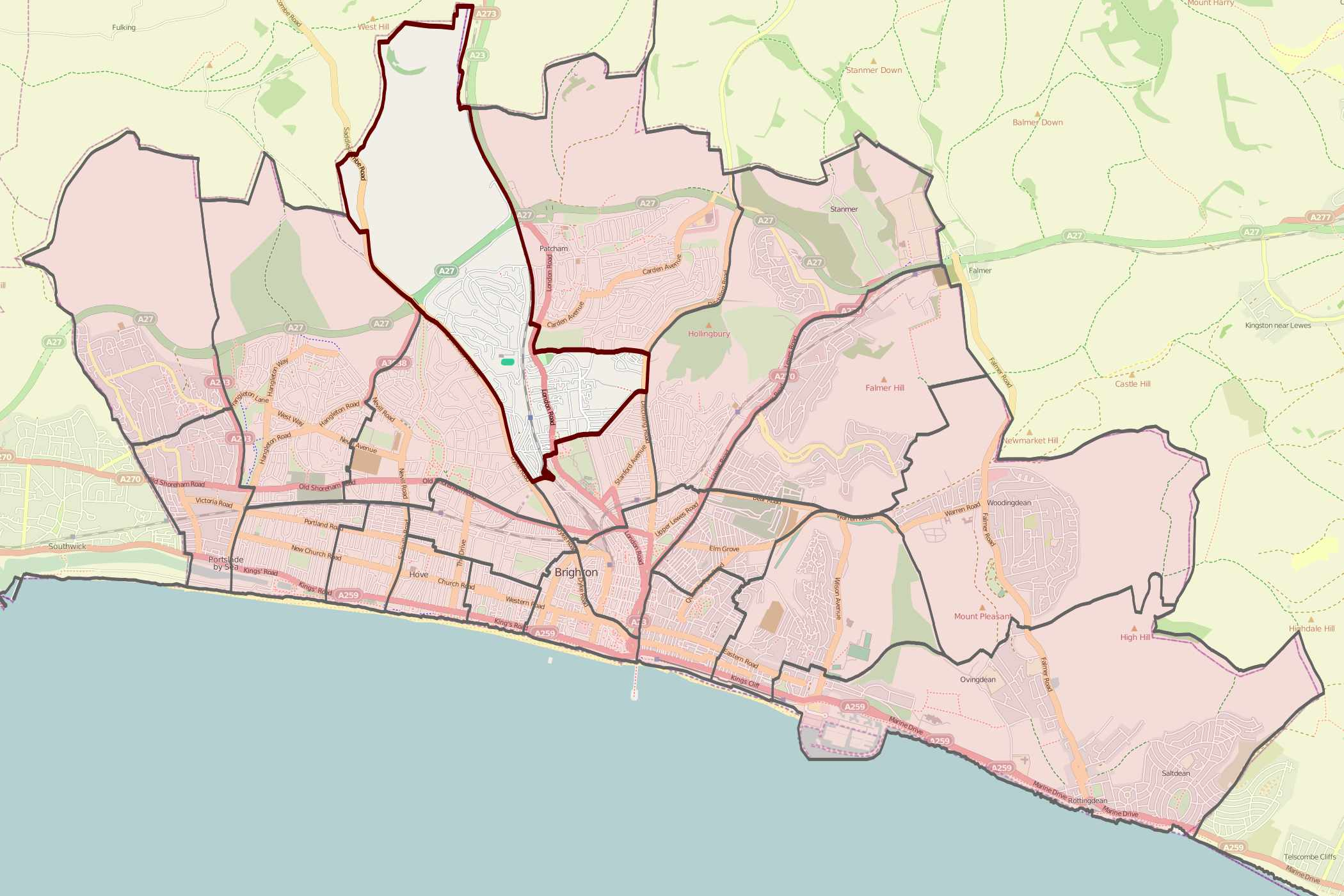
Withdean highlighted

Withdean (3)
Party	Candidate	Votes	%	±%
Conservative	Ann Norman	3,495	14.90	+1.55
Conservative	Ken Norman	3,348	14.28	+1.64
Conservative	Nick Taylor	2,985	12.73	+0.73
Labour Co-op	Juliet Diana McCaffery	2,552	10.88	+3.13
Green	Sue Shanks	2,189	9.33	−4.53
Labour Co-op	Leo Barraclough	2,170	9.25	+1.87
Labour Co-op	Michael John Middleton	2,145	9.15	+2.91
Green	Steve Griffiths	1,932	8.24	−3.24
Green	Jamie Lloyd	1,864	7.95	−2.66
Liberal Democrats	Hyder Kemal Khalil	560	2.39	+0.43
TUSC	Beth Granter	210	0.90	N/A
Turnout		6,555	58.50	+7.55
Conservative gain from Green		Swing		
Conservative hold		Swing		
Conservative hold		Swing		

=== Woodingdean ===
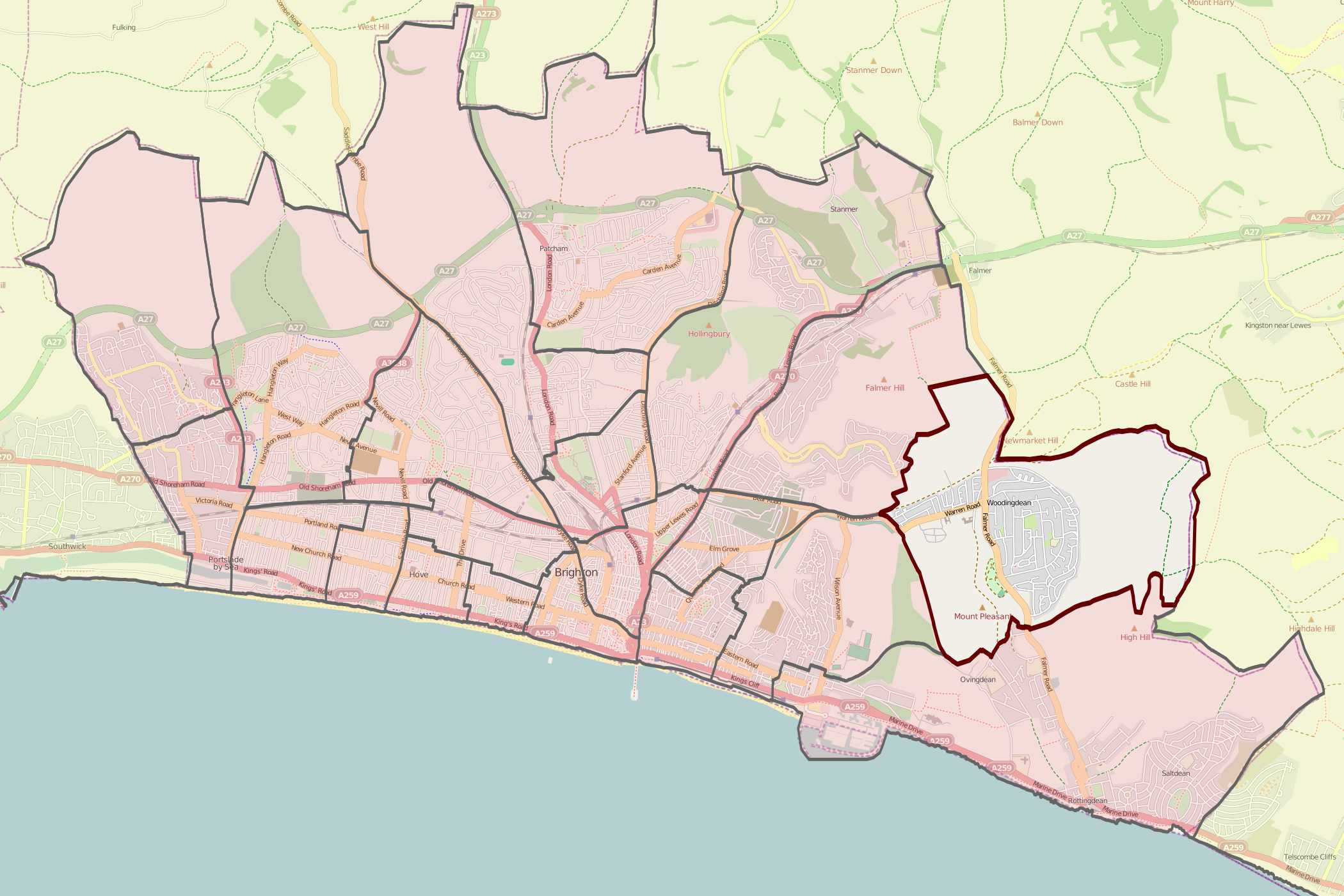
Woodingdean highlighted

Woodingdean (2)
Party	Candidate	Votes	%	±%
Conservative	Steve Bell	2,738	28.29	+0.49
Conservative	Dee Simson	2,636	27.24	+0.37
Labour Co-op	Judith Milton	1,697	17.54	+2.89
Labour Co-op	Elizabeth McGinley	1,400	14.47	+1.33
Green	Andrea Finch	439	4.54	−2.38
Green	Alexis Bear	412	4.26	−0.19
Liberal Democrats	Lawrence Eke	247	2.55	+0.47
TUSC	Timothy Roger Halpin	108	1.12	N/A
Turnout		4,066	53.39	+10.66
Conservative hold		Swing		
Conservative hold		Swing		
